

This is a complete list of all 1646 Statutory Instruments published in the United Kingdom in the year 1990.

1-100

 Caseins and Caseinates (Scotland) Amendment Regulations 1990 (S.I. 1990/1)
 Personal Community Charge (Relief) (England) Regulations 1990 (S.I. 1990/2)
 Welfare Food Amendment Regulations 1990 (S.I. 1990/3)
 Civil Aviation Authority (Amendment) Regulations 1990 (S.I. 1990/9)
 Local Government Finance Act 1988 (Miscellaneous Amendments and Repeals) Order 1990 (S.I. 1990/10)
 Electrical Equipment for Explosive Atmospheres (Certification) Regulations 1990 (S.I. 1990/13)
 Merseyside Residuary Body (Winding Up) (Amendment) Order 1990 (S.I. 1990/17)
 Stock Transfer (Substitution of Forms) Order 1990 (S.I. 1990/18)
 Banking Act 1987 (Exempt Transactions) (Amendment) Regulations 1990 (S.I. 1990/20)
 Petty Sessional Divisions (Gwent) Order 1990 (S.I. 1990/26)
 Financial Services Act 1986 (Investment Advertisements) (Exemptions) Order 1990 (S.I. 1990/27)
 British Citizenship (Designated Service) (Amendment) Order 1990 (S.I. 1990/28)
 Export of Sheep (Prohibition) (No. 2) Amendment Order 1990 (S.I. 1990/30)
 Food Protection (Emergency Prohibitions) (England) Amendment Order 1990 (S.I. 1990/31)
 Food Protection (Emergency Prohibitions) Amendment Order 1990 (S.I. 1990/32)
 Food Protection (Emergency Prohibitions) (Wales) (No. 5) Amendment Order 1990 (S.I. 1990/34)
 Bournemouth and District, South West, Tendring Hundred and West Hampshire (Pipelaying and Other Works) (Codes of Practice) Order 1990 (S.I. 1990/36)
 Food Protection (Emergency Prohibitions) (Contamination of Feeding Stuffs) (England) Order 1990 Approved by both Houses of Parliament (S.I. 1990/37)
 Social Security Benefit (Persons Abroad) Amendment Regulations 1990 (S.I. 1990/40)
 Local Government (Politically Restricted Posts) Regulations 1990 (S.I. 1990/42)
 Food Protection (Emergency Prohibitions) (Contamination of Feeding Stuff) (Wales) Order 1990 (S.I. 1990/43)
 Act of Sederunt (Fees in the Scottish Record Office) 1990 (S.I. 1990/44)
 Insider Dealing (Recognised Stock Exchange) (No. 2) Order 1990 (S.I. 1990/47)
 Milk Quota (Calculation of Standard Quota) (Amendment) Order 1990 (S.I. 1990/48)
 River Tay Catchment Area Protection (Renewal) Order 1990 (S.I. 1990/49)
 River Earn Catchment Area Protection Order 1990 (S.I. 1990/50)
 Airports (Designation) (Removal and Disposal of Vehicles) Order 1990 (S.I. 1990/54)
 Education (Inner London Education Authority) (Staff Transfer) Order 1990 (S.I. 1990/59)
 Fife and Tayside Regions and North East Fife and Perth and Kinross Districts (Butterwell/Burnside) Boundaries Amendment Order 1990 (S.I. 1990/60) (S. 5)
 Income Tax (Sub-Contractors in the Construction Industry) (Amendment) Regulations 1990 (S.I. 1990/61)
 Registration of Births, Deaths and Marriages (Fees) Order 1990 (S.I. 1990/65)
 Relevant Population (England) Regulations 1990 (S.I. 1990/68)
 Charging Authorities (Notification of Population to Precepting Authorities) (England) Regulations 1990 (S.I. 1990/69)
 Levying Bodies (General) Regulations 1990 (S.I. 1990/70)
 Transport Levying Bodies Regulations 1990 (S.I. 1990/71)
 Internal Drainage Boards (Finance) Regulations 1990 (S.I. 1990/72)
 Social Security (Industrial Injuries and Diseases) Miscellaneous Provisions (Amendment) Regulations 1990 (S.I. 1990/73)
 Income Tax (Employments) (No. 19) Regulations 1990 (S.I. 1990/79)
 Registration of Births, Deaths, Marriages, Etc. (Prescription of Forms) (Scotland) Amendment Regulations 1990 (S.I. 1990/85)
 Self-Governing Schools etc. (Scotland) Act 1989 (Commencement) Order 1990 (S.I. 1990/86)
 Children's Homes (Control and Discipline) Regulations 1990 (S.I. 1990/87)
 Motor Vehicles (Type Approval) (Great Britain) (Amendment) Regulations 1990 (S.I. 1990/94)
 A3 Trunk Road (Robin Hood Way, Kingston upon Thames) (Prohibition of Use of Gap in Central Reservation) Order 1990 (S.I. 1990/95)
 Companies Act 1989 (Commencement No. 1) Order 1990 (S.I. 1990/98)

101-200

 Industrial Training Levy (Plastics Processing) Order 1990 (S.I. 1990/101)
 Social Security Act 1989 (Commencement No. 3) Order 1990 (S.I. 1990/102)
 Disposal of Court Records (Scotland) Regulations 1990 (S.I. 1990/106)
 Community Charges (Deductions from Income Support) Regulations 1990 (S.I. 1990/107)
 The Gedling (Parishes) Order 1990 S.I. 1990/108
 Bovine Offal (Prohibition) (Scotland) Regulations 1990 (S.I. 1990/112)
 Community Charges (Deductions from Income Support) (Scotland) (Amendment) Regulations 1990 (S.I. 1990/113)
 Public Telecommunication System Designation (Cable North (Cumbernauld) Ltd) Order 1990 (S.I. 1990/114)
 Public Telecommunication System Designation (Cable North (Dumbarton) Ltd) Order 1990 (S.I. 1990/115)
 Public Telecommunication System Designation (Cable North (Motherwell) Ltd) Order 1990 (S.I. 1990/116)
 Electricity Act 1989 (Commencement No. 2) Order 1990 (S.I. 1990/117)
 National Rivers Authority (Levies) Regulations 1990 (S.I. 1990/118)
 Water Supply (Water Quality) (Scotland) Regulations 1990 (S.I. 1990/119)
 Controlled Waters (Lochs and Ponds) (Scotland) Order 1990 (S.I. 1990/120)
 Surface Waters (Classification) (Scotland) Regulations 1990 (S.I. 1990/121)
 Merchant Shipping (Formal Investigations) (Amendment) Rules 1990 (S.I. 1990/123)
 Education (Inner London Education Authority) (Property Transfer) Order 1990 (S.I. 1990/124)
 Local Government (Compensation for Premature Retirement) (Scotland) Amendment Regulations 1990 (S.I. 1990/125)
 Surface Waters (Dangerous Substances) (Classification) (Scotland) Regulations 1990 (S.I. 1990/126)
 Income-related Benefits Schemes Amendment Regulations 1990 (S.I. 1990/127)
 Export of Goods (Control) (Amendment) Order 1990 (S.I. 1990/128)
 Standard Community Charge (Multipliers) Order 1990 (S.I. 1990/129)
 Revenue Support Grant (Scotland) Order 1989S.I. 1990/130)
 Revenue Support Grant (Scotland) Order 1990 (S.I. 1990/131)
 Dairy Produce Quotas (Amendment) Regulations 1990 (S.I. 1990/132)
 Sea Fishing (Enforcement of Community Conservation Measures) (Amendment) Order 1990 (S.I. 1990/136)
 Sea Fishing (Enforcement of Community Quota Measures) Order 1990 (S.I. 1990/137)
 Third Country Fishing (Enforcement) Order 1990 (S.I. 1990/138)
 Free Zone (Liverpool) Designation (Variation) Order 1990 (S.I. 1990/139)
 Coroners' Records (Fees for Copies) (Amendment) Rules 1990 (S.I. 1990/140)
 Companies Act 1989 (Commencement No. 2) Order 1990 (S.I. 1990/142)
 Children (Admissibility of Hearsay Evidence) Order 1990 (S.I. 1990/143)
 Driving Licences (Community Driving Licence) Regulations 1990 (S.I. 1990/144)
 Non-Domestic Rating (Collection and Enforcement) (Miscellaneous Provisions) Regulations 1990 (S.I. 1990/145)
 Community Charges (Co-owners) Regulations 1990 (S.I. 1990/146)
 British Gas Corporation (Dissolution) Order 1990 (S.I. 1990/147)
 Pyramid Selling Schemes (Amendment) Regulations 1990 (S.I. 1990/150)
 Community Charges and Non-Domestic Rating (Demand Notices) (England) Regulations 1990 (S.I. 1990/156)
 Local Elections (Parishes and Communities) (Amendment) Rules 1990 (S.I. 1990/157)
 Local Elections (Principal Areas) (Amendment) Rules 1990 (S.I. 1990/158)
 Avon, Somerset and Wiltshire (County Boundaries) Order 1990 (S.I. 1990/159)
 Household Appliances (Noise Emission) Regulations 1990 (S.I. 1990/161)
 Standard Community Charge and Non-Domestic Rating (Definition of Domestic Property) Order 1990 (S.I. 1990/162)
 Electricity Supply Pension Scheme (Eligible Persons) Regulations 1990 (S.I. 1990/164)
 Gloucestershire and Wiltshire (County Boundaries) Order 1990 (S.I. 1990/170)
 The East Hertfordshire (Parishes) Order 1990 S.I. 1990/171
 Land Registration Fee Order 1990 (S.I. 1990/172)
 Drainage Rates (Forms) Regulations 1990 (S.I. 1990/173)
 National Health Service (Recognition of health service bodies) (Scotland) Order 1990 (S.I. 1990/177)
 Housing (Preservation of Right to Buy) (Amendment) Regulations 1990 (S.I. 1990/178)
 Housing (Extension of Right to Buy) Order 1990 (S.I. 1990/179)
 Education (School and Placing Information) (Scotland) Amendment Regulations 1990 (S.I. 1990/181)
 Local Authorities (Publicity Account) (Exemption) (Scotland) Amendment Order 1990 (S.I. 1990/182)
 College Councils (Scotland) Regulations 1990 (S.I. 1990/183)
 Electricity Act 1989 (Fees) Order 1990 (S.I. 1990/184)
 Buckinghamshire (District Boundaries) Order 1990 (S.I. 1990/185)
 Opencast Coal (Rate of Interest on Compensation) Order 1990 (S.I. 1990/188)
 Employment Act 1989 (Commencement and Transitional Provisions) Order 1990 (S.I. 1990/189)
 Railway Employment Exemption Regulations 1962 (Revocation) Order 1990 (S.I. 1990/190)
 Local Government and Housing Act 1989 (Commencement No. 4) Order 1990 (S.I. 1990/191)
 Electricity (Applications for Licences and Extensions of Licences) Regulations 1990 (S.I. 1990/192)
 Electricity (Class Exemptions from the Requirement for a Licence) Order 1990 (S.I. 1990/193)
 Electricity (Register) Order 1990 (S.I. 1990/194)
 Housing Support Grant (Scotland) Variation Order 1990 (S.I. 1990/195)
 Housing Support Grant (Scotland) Order 1990 (S.I. 1990/196)
 Electricity Act 1989 (Transfer Date) (Scotland) Order 1990 (S.I. 1990/197)
 London Government Reorganisation (Pensions etc.) (Amendment) Order 1990 (S.I. 1990/198)
 Official Secrets Act 1989 (Commencement) Order 1990 (S.I. 1990/199)
 Official Secrets Act 1989 (Prescription) Order 1990 (S.I. 1990/200)

201-300

 Housing (Right to Buy) (Prescribed Forms) (Amendment) Regulations 1990 (S.I. 1990/207)
 East of Abercynon – East of Dowlais Trunk Road (A4060) (Phase 2 – Improvement between Pentrebach and Mountain Hare and Slip Roads) Order 1990 (S.I. 1990/209)
 Medicines (Fees Relating to Medicinal Products for Human Use) Amendment Regulations 1990 (S.I. 1990/210)
 LondonFolkestoneDover Trunk Road A20 (Court Wood to Dover Section) Order 1990 (S.I. 1990/211)
 London-Folkestone-Dover Trunk Road A20 (Dawkinge Wood to Court Wood Section and Slip Roads) Order 1990 (S.I. 1990/212)
 London-Folkestone-Dover Trunk Road A20 (Folkestone-Dover Section Detrunking) Order 1990 (S.I. 1990/213)
 Drainage Charges Regulations 1990 (S.I. 1990/214)
 Prevention of Terrorism (Temporary Provisions) Act 1989 (Commencement No. 2) Order 1990 (S.I. 1990/215)
 Offshore Installations (Safety Zones) Order 1990 (S.I. 1990/216)
 Food Protection (Emergency Prohibitions) (Contamination of Feeding Stuff) (England) (Revocation) Order 1990 (S.I. 1990/217)
 Statutory Maternity Pay (Compensation of Employers) and Statutory Sick Pay (Additional Compensation of Employers) Amendment Regulations 1990 (S.I. 1990/218)
 Food Protection (Emergency Prohibitions) (Contamination of Feeding Stuff) (Wales) (Revocation) Order 1990 (S.I. 1990/219)
 Criminal Justice Act 1988 (Commencement No. 10) Order 1990 (S.I. 1990/220)
 Education (Training Grants) (Amendment) Regulations 1990 (S.I. 1990/221)
 Bovine Spongiform Encephalopathy Compensation Order 1990 (S.I. 1990/222)
 General Drainage Charges (Anglian Region) Order 1990 (S.I. 1990/223)
 Electricity Act 1989 (Nominated Companies) (England and Wales) Order 1990 (S.I. 1990/224)
 Electricity Act 1989 (Transfer Date) (England and Wales) Order 1990 (S.I. 1990/225)
 Cambridgeshire, Norfolk and Suffolk (County Boundaries) Order 1990 (S.I. 1990/228)
 Superannuation (Children's Pensions) (Earnings Limit) Order 1990 (S.I. 1990/230)
 Electricity Council and Electricity Boards Regulations 1990 (S.I. 1990/231)
 Poultry (Seizure of Hatching Eggs) Order 1990 (S.I. 1990/232)
 Commons Regulation (Therfield) Provisional Order Confirmation Act 1888 (Amendment) Order 1990 (S.I. 1990/233)
 Protection of Wrecks (Designation No. 1) Order 1990 (S.I. 1990/234)
 Atomic Energy (Mutual Assistance Convention) Order 1990 (S.I. 1990/235)
 European Communities (Definition of Treaties) (European School) Order 1990 (S.I. 1990/236)
 European Communities (Privileges of the European School) Order 1990 (S.I. 1990/237)
 Security Service Act 1989 (Overseas Territories) Order 1990 (S.I. 1990/238)
 United Kingdom Forces (Jurisdiction of Colonial Courts) (Amendment) Order 1990 (S.I. 1990/239)
 United Kingdom Forces (Jurisdiction of Colonial Courts) (Amendment No. 2) Order 1990 (S.I. 1990/240)
 Visiting Forces (Designation) (Colonies) (Amendment) Order 1990 (S.I. 1990/241)
 Visiting Forces Act (Application to Colonies) (Amendment) Order 1990 (S.I. 1990/242)
 Census Order 1990 (S.I. 1990/243)
 Health Service Commissioner for England (Special Hospitals Service Authority) Order 1990 (S.I. 1990/244)
 Electricity Supply (Amendment) (Northern Ireland) Order 1990 (S.I. 1990/245)
 Employment (Miscellaneous Provisions) (Northern Ireland) Order 1990 (S.I. 1990/246)
 Health and Personal Social Services(Special Agencies)(Northern Ireland) Order 1990 (S.I. 1990/247)
 Outer Space Act 1986 (Guernsey) Order 1990 (S.I. 1990/248)
 Security Service Act 1989 (Channel Islands) Order 1990 (S.I. 1990/249)
 Naval, Military and Air Forces etc. (Disablement and Death) Service Pensions Amendment Order 1990 (S.I. 1990/250)
 Collision Regulations (Seaplanes) (Amendment) Order 1990 (S.I. 1990/251)
 Collision Regulations (Seaplanes) (Guernsey) Order 1990 (S.I. 1990/252)
 Mersey Channel (Collision Rules) (Amendment) Order 1990 (S.I. 1990/253)
 River Hull (Navigation) Rules (Amendment) Order 1990 (S.I. 1990/254)
 Guaranteed Minimum Pensions Increase Order 1990 (S.I. 1990/255)
 Social Security (Industrial Injuries) (Regular Employment) Regulations 1990 (S.I. 1990/256)
 Statutory Sick Pay (Rate of Payment) Regulations 1990 (S.I. 1990/257)
 The Stroud (Parishes) Order 1990 S.I. 1990/260
 Scottish Local Elections Amendment Rules 1990 (S.I. 1990/262)
 Electricity (Non-Fossil Fuel Sources) (England and Wales) Order 1990 (S.I. 1990/263)
 Electricity Act 1989 (Modifications of Section 32(5) to (8)) Regulations 1990 (S.I. 1990/264)
 Electricity (Imported Capacity) Regulations 1990 (S.I. 1990/265)
 Fossil Fuel Levy Regulations 1990 (S.I. 1990/266)
 Area Boards (Payments for Use of Tax Losses) Order 1990 (S.I. 1990/267)
 Local Government Finance (Capital Money) (Consequential Amendments) Order 1990 (S.I. 1990/268)
 M1 London – Yorkshire Motorway (The North of Edgware Bury – Aldenham Special Roads Scheme 1962) (Partial Revocation) Scheme 1990 (S.I. 1990/269)
 General Optical Council (Registration and Enrolment (Amendment) Rules) Order of Council 1990 (S.I. 1990/270)
 Hampshire (District Boundaries) Order 1990 (S.I. 1990/274)
 Education (Grants for Training of Teachers and Community Education Workers) (Scotland) Regulations 1990 (S.I. 1990/277)
 Co-operative Development Agency (Winding Up and Dissolution) Order 1990 (S.I. 1990/279)
 A41 London–Birmingham Trunk Road (Berkhamsted Bypass) Order 1985 Amendment Order and New Trunk Roads Order 1990 (S.I. 1990/283)
 A41 London–Birmingham Trunk Road (East of Bourne End to South of Kings Langley) Detrunking Order 1990 (S.I. 1990/284)
 A41 LondonBirmingham Trunk Road (East of Tring to East of Bourne End, Berkhamsted) Detrunking Order 1990 (S.I. 1990/285)
 A41 London - Birmingham Trunk Road (Kings Langley Bypass) Order 1985 Amendment Order and New Trunk Roads Order 1990 (S.I. 1990/286)
 Personal Community Charge (Relief) (Wales) Regulations 1990 (S.I. 1990/288)
 (A500) Hanford-Etruria Principal Road (Trunking) and (A34) Winchester-Preston Trunk Road (De-trunking from Hanford to Talke) Order 1990 (S.I. 1990/289)
 Firearms (Variation of Fees) Order 1990 (S.I. 1990/290)
 Petty Sessional Divisions (Avon) Order 1990 (S.I. 1990/291)
 Community Charges and Non-Domestic Rating (Demand Notices) (Wales) Regulations 1990 (S.I. 1990/293)
 Borders and Lothian Regions and Tweeddale and Midlothian Districts (Carlops) Boundaries Amendment Order 1990 (S.I. 1990/294) (S. 27)
 Schools (Safety and Supervision of Pupils) (Scotland) Regulations 1990 (S.I. 1990/295)
 Borders Regional Council (Galashiels Mill Lade) (Amendment) Water Order 1990 (S.I. 1990/296)

301-400

 Petty Sessional Divisions (Hertfordshire) Order 1990 (S.I. 1990/303)
 Dangerous Substances (Notification and Marking of Sites) Regulations 1990 (S.I. 1990/304)
 Potteries etc. (Modifications) Regulations 1990 (S.I. 1990/305)
 Education (Grants) (Travellers and Displaced Persons) Regulations 1990 (S.I. 1990/306)
 Census Regulations 1990 (S.I. 1990/307)
 Hill Livestock (Compensatory Allowances) (Amendment) Regulations 1990 (S.I. 1990/308)
 Diseases of Animals (Approved Disinfectants) (Amendment) Order 1990 (S.I. 1990/309)
 Data Protection (Regulation of Financial Services etc.) (Subject Access Exemption) (Amendment) Order 1990 (S.I. 1990/310)
 Common Land (Rectification of Registers) Regulations 1990 (S.I. 1990/311)
 Social Security Act 1989 (Commencement No. 4) Order 1990 (S.I. 1990/312)
 Education (Inner London Education Authority) (Property Transfer) (Amendment) Order 1990 (S.I. 1990/313)
 Land Registration Rules 1990 (S.I. 1990/314)
 Value Added Tax (Cars) (Amendment) Order 1990 (S.I. 1990/315)
 Local Authorities (Capital Finance) (Rate of Discount) Regulations 1990 (S.I. 1990/316)
 Road Vehicles (Construction and Use) (Amendment) Regulations 1990 (S.I. 1990/317)
 Electricity Supply Pension Scheme (Transfer Date Amendments) Regulations 1990 (S.I. 1990/318)
 Smoke Control Areas (Authorised Fuels) Regulations 1990 (S.I. 1990/319)
 Social Security Benefits Up-rating Order 1990 (S.I. 1990/320)
 Social Security (Contributions) (Re-rating) Order 1990 (S.I. 1990/321)
 Social Security (Recoupment) Regulations 1990,S.I. 1990/322)
 Land Charges (Fees) Order 1990 (S.I. 1990/323)
 Caithness Salmon Fishery District Designation Order 1990 (S.I. 1990/324)
 Firearms (Variation of Fees) (Scotland) Order 1990 (S.I. 1990/325)
 Census (Scotland) Regulations 1990 (S.I. 1990/326)
 Land Charges Fees Rules 1990 (S.I. 1990/327)
 The Shepway (Parishes) Order 1990 S.I. 1990/329
 Local Government Act 1988 (Defined Activities) (Exemption) (England) Order 1990 (S.I. 1990/333)
 Fixed Penalty (Increase) Order 1990 (S.I. 1990/334)
 Fixed Penalty Offences Order 1990 (S.I. 1990/335)
 Magistrates' Courts (Witnesses' Addresses) Rules 1990 (S.I. 1990/336)
 River Ness Salmon Fishery District (Baits and Lures) Regulations 1990 (S.I. 1990/337)
 Certification Officer (Amendment of Fees) Regulations 1990 (S.I. 1990/339)
 City of London (Non-Domestic Rating Multiplier) Order 1990 (S.I. 1990/340)
 Smoke Control Areas (Exempted Fireplaces) Order 1990 (S.I. 1990/345)
 Electricity (Protected Persons) (England and Wales) Pension Regulations 1990 (S.I. 1990/346)
 Poultry Breeding Flocks and Hatcheries (Registration and Testing) (Amendment) Order 1990 (S.I. 1990/347)
 Poultry Laying Flocks (Testing and Registration etc.) (Amendment) Order 1990 (S.I. 1990/348)
 Financial Services Act 1986 (Restriction of Scope of Act and Meaning of Collective Investment Scheme) Order 1990 (S.I. 1990/349)
 Public Telecommunication System Designation (Norwich Cablevision Ltd) Order 1990 (S.I. 1990/350)
 Building Societies (Designation of Qualifying Bodies) (Amendment) Order 1990 (S.I. 1990/351)
 Building Societies (Designation of Qualifying Bodies) (Amendment) (No 2) Order 1990 (S.I. 1990/352)
 Education (School Financial Statements) (Prescribed Particulars etc.) Regulations 1990 (S.I. 1990/353)
 Companies Act 1989 (Commencement No. 3, Transitional Provisions and Transfer of Functions under the Financial Services Act 1986) Order 1990 (S.I. 1990/354)
 Companies Act 1989 (Commencement No. 4 and Transitional and Saving Provisions) Order 1990 (S.I. 1990/355)
 Central and Tayside Regions and Stirling and Perth and Kinross Districts (Loch Earn/Loch Tay) Boundaries Amendment Order 1990 (S.I. 1990/356) (S. 34)
 Public Telecommunication System Designation (United Cable Television (London South) Plc) (Merton & Sutton) Order 1990 (S.I. 1990/357)
 A339 Basingstoke to Newbury Trunk Road (Basingstoke Northern Bypass Trunking and Detrunking) Order 1990 (S.I. 1990/358)
 Blood Tests (Evidence of Paternity) (Amendment) Regulations 1990 (S.I. 1990/359)
 Education (Areas to which Pupils and Students Belong) (Amendment) Regulations 1990 (S.I. 1990/361)
 Education (Inner London Education Authority) (Horniman and Geffrye Museums) (Transfer of Functions) Order 1990 (S.I. 1990/362)
 Landlord and Tenant Act 1954 (Appropriate Multiplier) Order 1990 (S.I. 1990/363)
 Merchant Shipping (Light Dues) Regulations 1990 (S.I. 1990/364)
 Merchant Shipping (Load Lines) (Exemption) (Amendment) Order 1990 (S.I. 1990/365)
 Community Charges and Non-Domestic Rating (Demand Notices) (England) (Amendment) Regulations 1990 (S.I. 1990/366)
 Town and Country Planning (Assessment of Environmental Effects) (Amendment) Regulations 1990 (S.I. 1990/367)
 Lothian and Strathclyde Regions and West Lothian and Motherwell Districts (Westcraigs) Boundaries Amendment Order 1990 (S.I. 1990/368) (S. 35)
 Community Charges and Non-Domestic Rating (Demand Notices) (City of London) Regulations 1990 (S.I. 1990/369)
 Home Purchase Assistance (Winding Up of Scheme) Order 1990 (S.I. 1990/374)
 A663 Broadway (A627(M) to Manchester City Boundary) (Trunking) Order 1990 (S.I. 1990/375)
 Act of Sederunt (Fees of Messengers-at-Arms) 1990 (S.I. 1990/379)
 Act of Sederunt (Copyright, Designs and Patents) 1990 (S.I. 1990/380)
 Act of Sederunt (Fees of Sheriff Officers) 1990 (S.I. 1990/381)
 National Health Service (Superannuation) (Scotland) Amendment Regulations 1990 (S.I. 1990/382)
 Teachers' Superannuation (Scotland) Amendment Regulations 1990 (S.I. 1990/383)
 Employment Protection (Variation of Limits) Order 1990 (S.I. 1990/384)
 Sugar Beet (Research and Education) Order 1990 (S.I. 1990/385)
 Gaming Act (Variation of Fees) Order 1990 (S.I. 1990/386)
 Lotteries (Gaming Board Fees) Order 1990 (S.I. 1990/387)
 Assistance for Minor Works to Dwellings Regulations 1990 (S.I. 1990/388)
 Electricity Supply (Amendment) Regulations 1990 (S.I. 1990/390)
 Education Reform Act 1988 (Commencement No. 8 and Amendment) Order 1990 (S.I. 1990/391)
 Electricity Act 1989 (Requirement of Consent for Hydro-electric Generating Stations) (Scotland) Order 1990 (S.I. 1990/392)
 Electricity Act 1989 (Modification of Local Enactments) (Scotland) Order 1990 (S.I. 1990/393)
 Electricity Act 1989 (Scottish Nuclear Limited) Extinguishment of Loans Order 1990 (S.I. 1990/394)
 Potassium Bromate (Prohibition as a Flour Improver) (Scotland) Regulations 1990 (S.I. 1990/395)
 Rent Officers (Additional Functions) (Scotland) Order 1990 (S.I. 1990/396)
 Gaming Act (Variation of Fees) (Scotland) Order 1990 (S.I. 1990/397)
 City of Edinburgh, East Lothian and Midlothian Districts (Whitehill Mains) Boundaries Amendment Order 1990 (S.I. 1990/398) (S. 47)
 Potassium Bromate (Prohibition as a Flour Improver) Regulations 1990 (S.I. 1990/399)
 Immigration (Registration with Police) (Amendment) Regulations 1990 (S.I. 1990/400)

401-500

 Police (Amendment) Regulations 1990 (S.I. 1990/401)
 Personal Community Charge (Relief) (England) (Amendment) Regulations 1990 (S.I. 1990/402)
 Local Government Act 1988 (Defined Activities) (Exemptions) (England) (No. 2) Order 1990 (S.I. 1990/403)
 Local Authorities (Capital Finance) (Prescribed Bodies) Regulations 1990 (S.I. 1990/404)
 London Residuary Body (Transfer of Property etc.) Order 1990 (S.I. 1990/419)
 Value Added Tax (Cash Accounting) (Amendment) Regulations 1990 (S.I. 1990/420)
 Personal Community Charge (Relief) (Scotland) Regulations 1990 (S.I. 1990/421)
 Local Government Superannuation (Scotland) Amendment Regulations 1990 (S.I. 1990/422)
 Education (National Curriculum) (Attainment Targets and Programmes of Study in English) (No. 2) Order 1990 (S.I. 1990/423)
 Education (National Curriculum) (Attainment Targets and Programmes of Study in Technology) Order 1990 (S.I. 1990/424)
 Oil Pollution (Compulsory Insurance) (Amendment) Regulations 1990 (S.I. 1990/425)
 Local Authorities (Capital Finance) (Approved Investments) Regulations 1990 (S.I. 1990/426)
 Rent Assessment Committees (England and Wales) (Amendment) Regulations 1990 (S.I. 1990/427)
 Rent Officers (Additional Functions) Order 1990 (S.I. 1990/428)
 Local Government and Housing Act 1989 (Commencement No. 5 and Transitional Provisions) Order 1990 (S.I. 1990/431)
 Local Authorities (Capital Finance) Regulations 1990 (S.I. 1990/432)
 Local Authorities (Goods and Services) (Public Bodies) Order 1990 (S.I. 1990/433)
 References to Rating (Housing) Regulations 1990 (S.I. 1990/434)
 Accounts and Audit (Amendment) Regulations 1990 (S.I. 1990/435)
 Companies (Unregistered Companies) (Amendment) Regulations 1990 (S.I. 1990/438)
 Insolvency Practitioners Regulations 1990 (S.I. 1990/439)
 Oversea Companies (Accounts) (Modifications and Exemptions) Order 1990 (S.I. 1990/440)
 Lyon Court and Office Fees (Variation) Order 1990 (S.I. 1990/441)
 Electricity and Pipe-line Works (Assessment of Environmental Effects) Regulations 1990 (S.I. 1990/442)
 Offshore Generating Stations (Exemption) Order 1990 (S.I. 1990/443)
 Housing (Prescribed Forms) Regulations 1990 (S.I. 1990/447)
 Goods Vehicles (Plating and Testing) (Amendment) Regulations 1990 (S.I. 1990/448)
 Motor Vehicles (Tests) (Amendment) Regulations 1990 (S.I. 1990/449)
 Public Service Vehicles (Conditions of Fitness, Equipment, Use and Certification) (Amendment) Regulations 1990 (S.I. 1990/450)
 Horticultural Development Council (Amendment) Order 1990 (S.I. 1990/454)
 Electricity (Applications for Consent) Regulations 1990 (S.I. 1990/455)
 New Towns (Defects Grants) (Payments to District Councils) (Extensions of Time) Order 1990 (S.I. 1990/456)
 Town and Country Planning General Development (Amendment) Order 1990 (S.I. 1990/457)
 Civil Aviation (Navigation Services Charges) (Fifth Amendment) Regulations 1990 (S.I. 1990/458)
 Police (Grant) (Amendment) Order 1990 (S.I. 1990/459)
 Wireless Telegraphy (Broadcast Licence Charges and Exemption) (Amendment) Regulations 1990 (S.I. 1990/460)
 Motor Vehicles (Type Approval and Approval Marks) (Fees) Regulations 1990 (S.I. 1990/461)
 Personal Community Charge (Exemption for the Severely Mentally Impaired) Order 1990 (S.I. 1990/462)
 M3 Motorway (Bar End-Compton Section) Scheme 1990 (S.I. 1990/463)
 M3 Motorway (Bar End—Compton Section) Connecting Roads Scheme 1990 (S.I. 1990/464)
 Town and Country Planning (Blight Provisions) Order 1990 (S.I. 1990/465)
 Fixed Penalty Offences (Scotland) Order 1990 (S.I. 1990/466)
 Fixed Penalty (Increase) (Scotland) Order 1990 (S.I. 1990/467)
 National Health Service (Charges for Drugs and Appliances) (Scotland) Amendment Regulations 1990 (S.I. 1990/468)
 Police (Scotland) Amendment Regulations 1990 (S.I. 1990/469)
 High Court of Justiciary Fees Amendment Order 1990 (S.I. 1990/470)
 Legal Aid (Scotland) (Fees in Civil Proceedings) Amendment Regulations 1990 (S.I. 1990/471)
 Sheriff Court Fees Amendment Order 1990 (S.I. 1990/472)
 Civil Legal Aid (Scotland) (Fees) Amendment Regulations 1990 (S.I. 1990/473)
 Criminal Legal Aid (Scotland) (Fees) Amendment Regulations 1990 (S.I. 1990/474)
 Scottish Land Court (Fees) Order 1990 (S.I. 1990/475)
 Court of Session etc. Fees Amendment Order 1990 (S.I. 1990/476)
 Lands Tribunal for Scotland (Amendment) (Fees) Rules 1990 (S.I. 1990/477)
 Measuring Instruments (EEC Requirements) (Fees) (Amendment) Regulations 1990 (S.I. 1990/478)
 Industrial Tribunals (Interest) Order 1990 (S.I. 1990/479)
 Education (Inner London Education Authority) (Schools Designation) (No. 2) Order 1990 (S.I. 1990/480)
 Education (Gloucestershire College of Arts and Technology (Higher Education) Higher Education Corporation) (Dissolution) Order 1990 (S.I. 1990/481)
 Education (Harrow College of Higher Education Higher Education Corporation) (Dissolution) Order 1990 (S.I. 1990/482)
 Pensions Increase (Review) Order 1990 (S.I. 1990/483)
 Civil Legal Aid (Assessment of Resources) (Amendment) Regulations 1990 (S.I. 1990/484)
 Land Charges (Amendment) Rules 1990 (S.I. 1990/485)
 Legal Advice and Assistance (Amendment) Regulations 1990 (S.I. 1990/486)
 Legal Advice and Assistance at Police Stations (Remuneration) (Amendment) Regulations 1990 (S.I. 1990/487)
 Legal Aid in Criminal and Care Proceedings (Costs) (Amendment) Regulations 1990 (S.I. 1990/488)
 Legal Aid in Criminal and Care Proceedings (General) (Amendment) Regulations 1990 (S.I. 1990/489)
 Matrimonial Causes (Costs) (Amendment) Rules 1990 (S.I. 1990/490)
 Register of County Court Judgments (Amendment) Regulations 1990 (S.I. 1990/491)
 Rules of the Supreme Court (Amendment) 1990 (S.I. 1990/492)
 Local Government Finance (Payments) (English Authorities) Regulations 1990 (S.I. 1990/493)
 Electricity (Non-Fossil Fuel Sources) (England and Wales) (Amendment) Order 1990 (S.I. 1990/494)
 National Health Service (Optical Charges and Payments) Amendment Regulations 1990 (S.I. 1990/495)
 Local Government, Reorganisation (Capital Money) (West Yorkshire) (Amendment) Order 1990 (S.I. 1990/496)
 Compulsory Purchase of Land (Vesting Declarations) Regulations 1990 (S.I. 1990/497)
 National Assistance (Charges for Accommodation) Amendment Regulations 1990 (S.I. 1990/498)

501-600

 Merger (Prenotification) Regulations 1990 (S.I. 1990/501)
 Central Rating Lists (Amendment) Regulations 1990 (S.I. 1990/502)
 Local Government Superannuation (Funds etc.) Regulations 1990 (S.I. 1990/503)
 Sea Fish Licensing (Variation) Order 1990 (S.I. 1990/504)
 Valuation for Rating (Decapitalisation Rate) (Scotland) Regulations 1990 (S.I. 1990/505)
 Electricity Act 1989 (North of Scotland Specified Area) Order 1990 (S.I. 1990/506)
 Town and Country Planning (Appeals) (Written Submissions Procedure) (Scotland) Regulations 1990 (S.I. 1990/507)
 Town and Country Planning (General Development) (Scotland) Amendment Order 1990 (S.I. 1990/508)
 National Health Service (Optical Charges and Payments) (Scotland) Amendment Regulations 1990 (S.I. 1990/509)
 Electricity (Protected Persons) (Scotland) Pension Regulations 1990 (S.I. 1990/510)
 Housing and Planning Act 1986 (Commencement No. 14) Order 1990 (S.I. 1990/511)
 Compulsory Purchase by Non-Ministerial Acquiring Authorities (Inquiries Procedure) Rules 1990 (S.I. 1990/512)
 Education (Inner London Education Authority) (Staff Transfer) (No. 2) Order 1990 (S.I. 1990/513)
 Building Societies (Designation of Qualifying Bodies) (Amendment) (No 3) Order 1990 (S.I. 1990/514)
 Companies (Summary Financial Statement) Regulations 1990 (S.I. 1990/515)
 County Court (Amendment) Rules 1990 (S.I. 1990/516)
 County Court (Forms) (Amendment) Rules 1990 (S.I. 1990/517)
 Court Funds (Amendment) Rules 1990 (S.I. 1990/518)
 Representation of the People Act 1989 (Commencement No. 2) Order 1990 (S.I. 1990/519)
 Representation of the People (Amendment) Regulations 1990 (S.I. 1990/520)
 Local Government Reorganisation (Superannuation and Compensation) Regulations 1990 (S.I. 1990/521)
 Foreign Marriage (Amendment) Act 1988 (Commencement) Order 1990 (S.I. 1990/522)
 Finance Act 1985 (Interest on Tax) (Prescribed Rate) Order 1990 (S.I. 1990/523)
 Isles of Scilly (Water and Sewerage) (Miscellaneous Provisions) Order 1990 (S.I. 1990/524)
 Local Government Finance (Garden Squares) (Consequential Amendments) Order 1990 (S.I. 1990/525)
 Electricity Act 1989 (Consequential Modifications of Subordinate Legislation) Order 1990 (S.I. 1990/526)
 Electricity (Connection Charges) Regulations 1990 (S.I. 1990/527)
 Electricity Generating Stations and Overhead Lines (Inquiries Procedure) Rules 1990 (S.I. 1990/528)
 Local Authorities (Discretionary Expenditure Limits) Order 1990 (S.I. 1990/529)
 Poultry Flocks, Hatcheries and Processed Animal Protein (Fees) Order 1990 (S.I. 1990/530)
 Justices of the Peace Act 1979 (Amendment) Order 1990 (S.I. 1990/531)
 Education (Governing Bodies of Institutions of Higher and Further Education) Regulations 1990 (S.I. 1990/532)
 Community Charge Benefits (Permitted Total) Order 1990 (S.I. 1990/533)
 Housing Benefit (Permitted Totals) Order 1990 (S.I. 1990/534)
 Personal Injuries (Civilians) Amendment Scheme 1990 (S.I. 1990/535)
 Social Security (Refunds) (Repayment of Contractual Maternity Pay) Regulations 1990 (S.I. 1990/536)
 National Health Service (Charges for Drugs and Appliances) Amendment Regulations 1990 (S.I. 1990/537)
 National Health Service (Service Committees and Tribunal) Amendment Regulations 1990 (S.I. 1990/538)
 Industrial Assurance (Fees) Regulations 1990 (S.I. 1990/539)
 Building Societies (General Charge and Fees) Regulations 1990 (S.I. 1990/540)
 Friendly Societies (Fees) Regulations 1990 (S.I. 1990/541)
 Industrial and Provident Societies (Amendment of Fees) Regulations 1990 (S.I. 1990/542)
 Industrial and Provident Societies (Credit Unions) (Amendment of Fees) Regulations 1990 (S.I. 1990/543)
 Tobacco Products Regulations 1979 (Amendment) Regulations 1990 (S.I. 1990/544)
 Community Charges (Deductions from Income Support) (No. 2) Regulations 1990 (S.I. 1990/545)
 Housing Benefit (General) Amendment Regulations 1990 (S.I. 1990/546)
 Income Support (General) Amendment Regulations 1990 (S.I. 1990/547)
 National Health Service (Travelling Expenses and Remission of Charges) Amendment Regulations 1990 (S.I. 1990/548)
 Education (Grant-maintained Schools) (Finance) Regulations 1990 (S.I. 1990/549)
 Insurance (Fees) Regulations 1990 (S.I. 1990/550)
 National Health Service (Travelling Expenses and Remission of Charges) (Scotland) Amendment Regulations 1990 (S.I. 1990/551)
 Transport (Scotland) Act 1989 (Transfer of Shipping Companies) Appointed Day Order 1990 (S.I. 1990/552)
 Reserve Forces Act 1980 (Constitution of Associations) Order 1990 (S.I. 1990/553)
 Local Government Reorganisation (Capital Money) (Greater London) Order 1990 (S.I. 1990/554)
 Merchant Shipping (Fees) Regulations 1990 (S.I. 1990/555)
 Control of Asbestos in the Air Regulations 1990 (S.I. 1990/556)
 Industrial Training Levy (Construction Board) Order 1990 (S.I. 1990/557)
 Industrial Training Levy (Engineering Board) Order 1990 (S.I. 1990/558)
 Bankruptcy and Companies (Department of Trade and Industry) Fees (Amendment) Order 1990 (S.I. 1990/559)
 Insolvency Fees (Amendment) Order 1990 (S.I. 1990/560)
 Representation of the People (Northern Ireland) (Amendment) Regulations 1990 (S.I. 1990/561)
 European Parliamentary Elections (Northern Ireland) (Amendment) Regulations 1990 (S.I. 1990/562)
 Town and Country Planning (Fees for Applications and Deemed Applications)(Scotland) Regulations 1990 (S.I. 1990/563)
 General Drainage Charges (Forms) Regulations 1990 (S.I. 1990/564)
 Medicines (Exemption from Licences) (Wholesale Dealing) Order 1990 (S.I. 1990/566)
 Medicines (Exemptions from Licences) (Intermediate Medicated Feeding Stuffs) (Amendment) Order 1990 (S.I. 1990/567)
 Medicines (Veterinary Drugs) (Pharmacy and Merchants' List) (No.2) (Amendment) Order 1990 (S.I. 1990/568)
 Welfare Food Amendment (No. 2) Regulations 1990 (S.I. 1990/571)
 Companies (Forms) (Amendment) Regulations 1990 (S.I. 1990/572)
 Local Government Finance Act 1988 Commencement (Scotland) Amendment Order 1990 (S.I. 1990/573)
 Family Credit (General) Amendment Regulations 1990 (S.I. 1990/574)
 The Crewe and Nantwich (Parishes) Order 1990 S.I. 1990/576
 Electricity Act 1989 (Consequential Modifications of Enactments) Order 1990 (S.I. 1990/577)
 Social Fund (Miscellaneous Amendments) Regulations 1990 (S.I. 1990/580)
 Social Security (Attendance Allowance) Amendment Regulations 1990 (S.I. 1990/581)
 Non-Domestic Rating (Alteration of Lists and Appeals) Regulations 1990 (S.I. 1990/582)
 Renfrew and City of Glasgow Districts (Atholl Crescent, Southwold Road, Rosshall, Bullwood and Hurlet) Boundaries Amendment Order 1990 (S.I. 1990/584) (S. 74)
 Occupational Pension Schemes (Additional Voluntary Contributions) (Amendment) Regulations 1990 (S.I. 1990/585)
 Retirement Benefits Schemes (Tax Relief on Contributions) (Disapplication of Earnings Cap) Regulations 1990 (S.I. 1990/586)
 Anguilla Constitution (Amendment) Order 1990 (S.I. 1990/587)
 Copyright (Hong Kong) (Amendment) Order 1990 (S.I. 1990/588)
 Foreign Compensation (Financial Provisions) Order 1990 (S.I. 1990/589)
 Merchant Shipping (Liner Conferences) (Hong Kong) (Amendment) Order 1990 (S.I. 1990/590)
 Outer Space Act 1986 (Hong Kong) Order 1990 (S.I. 1990/591)
 Appropriation(Northern Ireland) Order 1990 (S.I. 1990/592)
 Companies (Northern Ireland) Order 1990 (S.I. 1990/593)
 Licensing (Northern Ireland) Order 1990 (S.I. 1990/594)
 Local Elections (Northern Ireland) (Amendment) Order 1990 (S.I. 1990/595)
 Outer Space Act 1986 (Isle of Man) Order 1990 (S.I. 1990/596)
 Outer Space Act 1986 (Jersey) Order 1990 (S.I. 1990/597)
 Foreign Marriage (Amendment) Order 1990 (S.I. 1990/598)
 Foreign Marriage (Armed Forces) (Amendment) Order 1990 (S.I. 1990/599)
 European Communities (Designation) Order 1990 (S.I. 1990/600)

601-700

 Employment Code of Practice (Trade Union Ballots on Industrial Action) Order 1990 (S.I. 1990/601)
 Local Authorities (Discretionary Expenditure) (Relevant Population) Regulations 1990 (S.I. 1990/602)
 Social Security (Adjudication) Amendment Regulations 1990 (S.I. 1990/603)
 Social Security (Contributions) Amendment Regulations 1990 (S.I. 1990/604)
 Social Security (Contributions) Amendment (No. 2) Regulations 1990 (S.I. 1990/605)
 Social Security (Contributions) (Re-rating) Consequential Amendment Regulations 1990 (S.I. 1990/606)
 Milk and Milk Products (Protection of Designations) Regulations 1990 (S.I. 1990/607)
 Non-Domestic Rating (Transitional Period) Regulations 1990 (S.I. 1990/608)
 Local Government Finance (Payments) (Welsh Authorities) Regulations 1990 (S.I. 1990/609)
 Seeds (Fees) (Amendment) Regulations 1990 (S.I. 1990/610)
 Seeds (Registration, Licensing and Enforcement) (Amendment) Regulations 1990 (S.I. 1990/611)
 National Assistance (Charges for Accommodation) (Scotland) Regulations 1990 (S.I. 1990/612)
 Compulsory Purchase of Land Regulations 1990 (S.I. 1990/613)
 Housing and Planning Act 1986 (Commencement No. 15) Order 1990 (S.I. 1990/614)
 Langstone Harbour Revision Order 1990 (S.I. 1990/615)
 Diseases of Fish (Amendment of Definition of Infected) Order 1990 (S.I. 1990/616)
 Seeds (National Lists of Varieties) (Fees) Regulations 1990 (S.I. 1990/617)
 Plant Breeders' Rights (Fees) Regulations 1990 (S.I. 1990/618)
 Social Security (Industrial Injuries) (Dependency) (Permitted Earnings Limits) Order 1990 (S.I. 1990/619)
 Social Security (Invalid Care Allowance)Amendment Regulations 1990 (S.I. 1990/620)
 Social Security Benefit (Persons Abroad) Amendment (No. 2) Regulations 1990 (S.I. 1990/621)
 Statutory Maternity Pay (General) Amendment Regulations 1990 (S.I. 1990/622)
 Vaccine Damage Payments (Specified Disease) Order 1990 (S.I. 1990/623)
 Industrial Training Levy (Clothing and AlliedProducts) Order 1990 (S.I. 1990/624)
 Personal Community Charge (Relief) (Scotland) Amendment Regulations 1990 (S.I. 1990/625)
 Income Tax (Purchased Life Annuities) (Amendment) Regulations 1990 (S.I. 1990/626)
 Lloyd's Underwriters (Tax) (1987—88) Regulations 1990 (S.I. 1990/627)
 Motor Vehicles (Tests) (Amendment) (No. 2) Regulations 1990 (S.I. 1990/628)
 Representation of the People (Scotland) Amendment Regulations 1990 (S.I. 1990/629)
 Abolition of Domestic Rates (Domestic and Part Residential Subjects) (Scotland) Regulations 1990 (S.I. 1990/630)
 Civil Legal Aid (Scotland) Amendment Regulations 1990 (S.I. 1990/631)
 Advice and Assistance (Scotland) Amendment Regulations 1990 (S.I. 1990/632)
 Prevention of Terrorism (Temporary Provisions) Act 1989 (Continuance) Order 1990 (S.I. 1990/633)
 Social Security Benefits Up-rating Regulations 1990 (S.I. 1990/645)
 Unitary Development Plans (Greater London, Bradford and Barnsley) (Appointed Day) Order 1990 (S.I. 1990/652)
 Merchant Shipping (Passenger Counting and Recording Systems) Regulations 1990 (S.I. 1990/659)
 Merchant Shipping (Emergency Information for Passengers) Regulations 1990 (S.I. 1990/660)
 Act of Sederunt (Amendment of Sheriff Court Ordinary Cause, Summary Cause, and Small Claim, Rules) 1990 (S.I. 1990/661)
 Northern Police (Amalgamation) Amendment (No. 2) Scheme Order 1990 (S.I. 1990/662)
 Northern Combined Fire Area Administration (Amendment) (No.3) Scheme Order 1990 (S.I. 1990/663)
 Dairy Produce Quotas (Amendment) (No. 2) Regulations 1990 (S.I. 1990/664)
 Income-Related Benefits (Miscellaneous Amendments) Regulations 1990 (S.I. 1990/671)
 Mobility Allowance Amendment Regulations 1990 (S.I. 1990/672)
 Non-Domestic Rating (Caravan Sites) Regulations 1990 (S.I. 1990/673)
 Maentwrog—Bettws-y-Coed—East of Conway TrunkRoad (Llanrwst By-Pass and Other Diversions) (Part Revocation) Order 1990 (S.I. 1990/674)
 Northern Ireland (Emergency and Prevention of Terrorism Provisions) (Continuance) Order 1990 (S.I. 1990/675)
 Cable (Excepted Programmes) Order 1990 (S.I. 1990/676)
 Income Tax (Indexation) Order 1990 (S.I. 1990/677)
 Personal Equity Plan (Amendment) Regulations 1990 (S.I. 1990/678)
 Retirement Benefits Schemes (Indexationof Earnings Cap) Order 1990 (S.I. 1990/679)
 Inheritance Tax (Indexation) Order 1990 (S.I. 1990/680)
 Capital Gains Tax (Annual Exempt Amount) Order 1990 (S.I. 1990/681)
 Value Added Tax (Increase of Registration Limits) Order 1990 (S.I. 1990/682)
 Electrical Luminous Tube Signs (Scotland) Regulations 1990 (S.I. 1990/683)
 Community Charges (Levying, Collection and Payment) (Scotland) Amendment Regulations 1990 (S.I. 1990/684)
 Fishing Vessels (Acquisition and Improvement) (Grants) (Amendment) Scheme 1990 (S.I. 1990/685)
 Gas (Meters) (Variation of Fees) Regulations 1990 (S.I. 1990/686)
 European Parliamentary Elections (Amendment) Regulations 1990 (S.I. 1990/687)
 Workmen's Compensation (Supplementation) Amendment Scheme 1990 (S.I. 1990/688)
 Football Spectators Act 1989 (Commencement No. 1) Order 1990 (S.I. 1990/690)
 Returning Officers' Expenses Regulations 1990 (S.I. 1990/691)
 Financial Services Act 1986 (Listed Money Market Institutions and Miscellaneous Exemptions) Order 1990 (S.I. 1990/696)

701-800

 References to Rating (Housing) (Amendment) Regulations 1990 (S.I. 1990/701)
 Public Trustee (Fees) (Amendment) Order 1990 (S.I. 1990/702)
 Highways (Road Humps) Regulations 1990 (S.I. 1990/703)
 Traffic Signs (Amendment) Regulations 1990 and the Traffic Signs (Amendment) General Directions 1990 (S.I. 1990/704)
 Act of Sederunt (Rules of the Court of Session Amendment No.1) (Miscellaneous) 1990 (S.I. 1990/705)
 Rate Support Grant (Scotland) Order 1990 (S.I. 1990/706)
 Offshore Installations (Life-saving Appliances and Fire-fighting Equipment) (Amendment) Regulations 1990 (S.I. 1990/707)
 Community Charges (Administration and Enforcement) (Amendment) Regulations 1990 (S.I. 1990/711)
 Personal Community Charge (Qualifying Courses of Education) Regulations 1990 (S.I. 1990/712)
 Companies Act 1989 (Commencement No. 5 and Transitional and Saving Provisions) Order 1990 (S.I. 1990/713)
 Isles of Scilly (Road Traffic Regulation) Order 1990 (S.I. 1990/714)
 Highland Regional Council (Loch Lannsaidh) Water Order 1990 (S.I. 1990/715)
 Act of Sederunt (Fees of Solicitors in the Sheriff Court) (Amendment) 1990 (S.I. 1990/716)
 Act of Sederunt (Rules of the Court of Session Amendment No.2) (Solicitors' Fees) 1990 (S.I. 1990/717)
 Act of Adjournal (Consolidation Amendment No. 1) (Drug Trafficking) 1990 (S.I. 1990/718)
 Public Airport Companies (Capital Finance) Order 1990 (S.I. 1990/719)
 Passenger Transport Executives (Capital Finance) Order 1990 (S.I. 1990/720)
 Social Security (Claims and Payments) Amendment Regulations 1990 (S.I. 1990/725)
 Football Spectators (Designation of Enforcing Authority) Order 1990 (S.I. 1990/730)
 Football Spectators (Designation of Football Matches in England and Wales) Order 1990 (S.I. 1990/731)
 Football Spectators (Designation of Football Matches outside England and Wales) Order 1990 (S.I. 1990/732)
 Sussex Police (Amalgamation) (Amendment) Order 1990 (S.I. 1990/733)
 Export of Goods (Control) (Amendment No. 2) Order 1990 (S.I. 1990/735)
 Devon and Cornwall Police (Amalgamation) (Amendment) Order 1990 (S.I. 1990/736)
 Dyfed-Powys Police (Amalgamation) (Amendment) Order 1990 (S.I. 1990/737)
 South Wales Police (Amalgamation) (Amendment) Order 1990 (S.I. 1990/738)
 Thames Valley Police (Amalgamation) (Amendment) Order 1990 (S.I. 1990/739)
 Education (The London Institute) (Designated Staff) Order 1990 (S.I. 1990/740)
 Public Telecommunication System Designation (Videotron London Limited) (Greenwich and Lewisham) Order 1990 (S.I. 1990/749)
 Value Added Tax (Charities) Order 1990 (S.I. 1990/750)
 Value Added Tax (Tour Operators) (Amendment) Order 1990 (S.I. 1990/751)
 Value Added Tax (Transport) Order 1990 (S.I. 1990/752)
 A614 Trunk Road (Bawtry to Austerfield Roundabout) (De-Trunking) Order 1990 (S.I. 1990/754)
 Superannuation (National Museums and Galleries on Merseyside) Order 1990 (S.I. 1990/757)
 Northern Ireland (Emergency Provisions) Act 1978 (Amendment) Order 1990 (S.I. 1990/758)
 Electricity (Restrictive Trade Practices Act 1976) (Exemptions) Order 1990 (S.I. 1990/759)
 Movement of Animals (Restrictions) Order 1990 (S.I. 1990/760)
 Local Government and Housing Act 1989 (Commencement No. 6 and Miscellaneous Provisions) Order 1990 (S.I. 1990/762)
 Local Government (Promotion of Economic Development) Regulations 1990 (S.I. 1990/763)
 Juvenile Courts (London) (Amendment) Order 1990 (S.I. 1990/766)
 Local Authorities (Borrowing) Regulations 1990 (S.I. 1990/767)
 Register of County Court Judgments (Amendment No. 2) Regulations 1990 (S.I. 1990/768)
 Non-Domestic Rating (Alteration of Lists and Appeals) (Amendment) Regulations 1990 (S.I. 1990/769)
 A12 Trunk Road (Eastern Avenue East, Havering) (Prohibition of Use of Gap in Central Reservation) Order 1990 (S.I. 1990/770)
 Combined Probation Areas (Gwent) Order 1990 (S.I. 1990/771)
 Education (Inner London Education Authority) (Property Transfer) (No. 2) Order 1990 (S.I. 1990/772)
 Education (Inner London Education Authority) (Transitional and Supplementary Provisions) Order 1990 (S.I. 1990/773)
 Education (Inner London Education Authority) (Transitional and Supplementary Provisions) (No. 2) Order 1990 (S.I. 1990/774)
 Education (Inner London Education Authority) (Repayment of Loans) Order 1990 (S.I. 1990/775)
 Local Government Finance (Repeals, Savings and Consequential Amendments) Order 1990 (S.I. 1990/776)
 General Rate Act 1967 and Related Provisions (Savings and Consequential Provision) Regulations 1990 (S.I. 1990/777)
 Local Authorities (Capital Finance) (Consequential Amendments) Order 1990 (S.I. 1990/778)
 Housing Corporation Advances (Increase of Limit) Order 1990 (S.I. 1990/779)
 The Wealden (Parishes) Order 1990 S.I. 1990/780
 Dairy Produce Quotas (Amendment) (No. 3) Regulations 1990 (S.I. 1990/784)
 Housing Benefit (Subsidy) Order 1990 (S.I. 1990/785)
 Regional Flood Defence Committees (Welsh Area) (Appointed Day) Order 1990 (S.I. 1990/786)
 National Health Service (Charges for Drugs and Appliances) (Scotland) Amendment (No.2) Regulations 1990 (S.I. 1990/787)
 Non-Domestic Rates (Levying) (Scotland) Regulations 1990 (S.I. 1990/788)
 Local Government (Promotion of Economic Development) (Amendment) Regulations 1990 (S.I. 1990/789)
 Meters (Approval of Pattern or Construction and Method of Installation) Regulations 1990 (S.I. 1990/791)
 Meters (Certification) Regulations 1990 (S.I. 1990/792)
 Sunderland (Castletown and Doxford Park) Enterprise Zones (Designation) Order 1990 (S.I. 1990/794)
 Sunderland (Hylton Riverside and Southwick) Enterprise Zone (Designation) Order 1990 (S.I. 1990/795)
 Education (Designated Institutions) (Amendment) Order 1990 (S.I. 1990/796)
 Housing and Planning Act 1986 (Commencement No. 16) Order 1990 (S.I. 1990/797)
 Act of Sederunt (Rules of the Court of Session Amendment No.2) (Shorthand Writers' Fees) 1990 (S.I. 1990/798)
 Act of Sederunt (Shorthand Writers' Fees) 1990 (S.I. 1990/799)
 Self-Governing Schools (Ballots and Publication of Proposals) (Scotland) Regulations 1990 (S.I. 1990/800)

801-900

 National Health Service (General Medical and Pharmaceutical Services) Amendment Regulations 1990 (S.I. 1990/801)
 Road Traffic (Driver Licensing and Information Systems) Act 1989 (Commencement No. 2) Order 1990 (S.I. 1990/802)
 Town and Country Planning (Compensation for Restrictions on Mineral Working) (Amendment) Regulations 1990 Approved by both Houses of ParliamentS.I. 1990/803)
 Gas and Electricity Industries (Rateable Values) (Amendment) Order 1990 (S.I. 1990/804)
 Police Pensions (Amendment) Regulations 1990 (S.I. 1990/805)
 Combined Probation Areas (Avon) Order 1990 (S.I. 1990/806)
 Milk and Milk Products (Protection of Designations) (Scotland) Regulations 1990 (S.I. 1990/816)
 Docks and Harbours (Rateable Values) (Scotland) Order 1990 (S.I. 1990/817)
 Forth Ports Authority (Rateable Values) (Scotland) Order 1990 (S.I. 1990/818)
 Caledonian MacBrayne Limited (Rateable Values) (Scotland) Order 1990 (S.I. 1990/819)
 Industrial and Freight Transport (Rateable Values) (Scotland) Order 1990 (S.I. 1990/820)
 British Telecommunications plc. (Rateable Values) (Scotland) Order 1990 (S.I. 1990/821)
 British Alcan Primary and Recycling Ltd. (Rateable Values) (Scotland) Order 1990 (S.I. 1990/822)
 Mines and Quarries (Rateable Values) (Scotland) Order 1990 (S.I. 1990/823)
 Gas Safety (Installation and Use) (Amendment) Regulations 1990 (S.I. 1990/824)
 Pneumoconiosis etc. (Workers' Compensation) (Payment of Claims) (Amendment) Regulations 1990 (S.I. 1990/825)
 Redundancy Payments (Local Government) (Modification) (Amendment) Order 1990 (S.I. 1990/826)
 Combined Probation Areas (Gloucestershire) Order 1990 (S.I. 1990/829)
 Housing (Management of Houses in Multiple Occupation) Regulations 1990 (S.I. 1990/830)
 Authorities for London Post-Graduate Teaching Hospitals (Establishment and Constitution) Amendment Order 1990 (S.I. 1990/833)
 Community Charge Benefits (General) Amendment Regulations 1990 (S.I. 1990/834)
 Community Charge Benefits (General) Amendment No. 2 Regulations 1990 (S.I. 1990/835)
 Lochaber Power Company (Rateable Values) (Scotland) Order 1990 (S.I. 1990/836)
 British Gas plc. (Rateable Values) (Scotland) Order 1990 (S.I. 1990/837)
 Glasgow Underground (Rateable Values) (Scotland) Order 1990 (S.I. 1990/838)
 Civil Legal Aid (Financial Conditions) (Scotland) Regulations 1990 (S.I. 1990/839)
 Advice and Assistance (Financial Conditions) (Scotland) Regulations 1990 (S.I. 1990/840)
 Combined Probation Areas (North Yorkshire) Order 1990 (S.I. 1990/841)
 Motor Vehicles (Driving Licences) (Amendment) Regulations 1990 (S.I. 1990/842)
 Charities (Borough Lands Charity, Chippenham) Order 1990 (S.I. 1990/843)
 Combined Probation Areas (Hertfordshire) Order 1990 (S.I. 1990/844)
 Local Government Officers (Political Restrictions) Regulations 1990 (S.I. 1990/851)
 PARLIAMENT S.I. 1990/853)
 British Railways Board (Rateable Values) (Scotland) Order 1990 (S.I. 1990/854)
 British Waterways Board (Rateable Values) (Scotland) Order 1990 (S.I. 1990/855)
 Water Undertakings (Rateable Values) (Scotland) Order 1990 (S.I. 1990/856)
 Mercury Communications Ltd. (Rateable Values) (Scotland) Order 1990 (S.I. 1990/857)
 Business Expansion Scheme (Substitution of Permitted Maximum Amount) Order 1990 (S.I. 1990/862)
 Court of Protection (Enduring Powers of Attorney) (Amendment) Rules 1990 (S.I. 1990/864)
 Driver Information Systems (Exemption) Order 1990 (S.I. 1990/865)
 Merchant Shipping (Light Dues) (Amendment) Regulations 1990 (S.I. 1990/866)
 A12 Trunk Road (Leyton Way, Waltham Forest) (Prescribed Routes) Order 1990 (S.I. 1990/867)
 Thames Water Utilities Limited (Pipelaying and Other Works) (Code of Practice) Order 1990 (S.I. 1990/876)
 Copyright (Certification of Licensing Scheme for Educational Recording of Broadcasts) (Guild Sound and Vision Limited) Order 1990 (S.I. 1990/878)
 Copyright (Certification of Licensing Scheme for Educational Recording of Broadcasts and Cable Programmes) (Educational Recording Agency Limited) Order 1990 (S.I. 1990/879)
 Sludge (Use in Agriculture) (Amendment) Regulations 1990 (S.I. 1990/880)
 Town and Country Planning (Control of Advertisements) (Amendment) Regulations 1990 (S.I. 1990/881)
 Renfrew and City of Glasgow Districts (Atholl Crescent, Southwold Road, Rosshall, Bullwood and Hurlet) Boundaries Amendment (No. 2) Order 1990 (S.I. 1990/882) (S. 115)
 National Health Service (General Medical and Pharmaceutical Services) (Scotland) Amendment Regulations 1990 (S.I. 1990/883)
 Loch Moidart, North Channel Scallops Fishery Order 1990 (S.I. 1990/884)
 Skills Training Agency (Designation) (No. 1) Order 1990 (S.I. 1990/886)
 Fertilisers Regulations 1990 (S.I. 1990/887)
 Restrictive Trade Practices (Standards and Arrangements) Order 1990 (S.I. 1990/888)
 Wireless Telegraphy Apparatus (Approval) (Test Fees) Order 1990 (S.I. 1990/889)
 M42 Birmingham—Nottingham Motorway (Monkspath to Coleshill Section) and Connecting Roads Scheme (No. 2) 1978 (Revocation) Scheme 1990 (S.I. 1990/890)
 Pilotage Act 1987 (Hartlepool Pilots' Benefit Fund) Order 1990 (S.I. 1990/891)
 Merchant Shipping (Passenger Ship Construction and Survey) (Amendment) Regulations 1990 (S.I. 1990/892)
 Export of Goods (Control) (Amendment No. 3) Order 1990 (S.I. 1990/893)
 Offshore Installations (Safety Zones) (No. 2) Order 1990 (S.I. 1990/896)
 Offshore Installations (Safety Zones) (No: 3) Order 1990 (S.I. 1990/897)
 A23 Trunk Road (Purley Way, Croydon (Prescribed Routes) Order 1990 (S.I. 1990/899)

901-1000

 National Health Service (Travelling Expenses and Remission of Charges) (Modification of Time Limit) (Scotland) Regulations 1990 (S.I. 1990/917)
 National Health Service (Travelling Expenses and Remission of Charges) (Modification of Time Limit) Regulations 1990 (S.I. 1990/918)
 Public Telecommunication System Designation (Bolton Telecable Ltd) Order 1990 (S.I. 1990/919)
 Public Telecommunication System Designation (Cable Haringey Ltd) Order 1990 (S.I. 1990/923)
 Public Telecommunication System Designation (Peterborough Cablevision Ltd) Order 1990 (S.I. 1990/924)
 Football Spectators Act 1989 (Commencement No. 2) Order 1990 (S.I. 1990/926)
 Guarantee Payments (Exemption) (No. 27) Order 1990 (S.I. 1990/927)
 Industrial Training (Transfer of the Activities of Establishment) Order 1990 (S.I. 1990/928)
 Skills Training Agency (Designation) (No. 2) Order 1990 (S.I. 1990/929)
 Local Elections (Principal Areas) (Declaration of Acceptance of Office) Order 1990 (S.I. 1990/932)
 Parking Act 1989 (Commencement) Order 1990 (S.I. 1990/933)
 Community Charges (Notices) (Substitute Charges) (England) Regulations 1990 (S.I. 1990/942)
 Milk Quota (Calculation of Standard Quota) (Scotland) Amendment Order 1990 (S.I. 1990/943)
 Crofters etc. Building Grants (Scotland) Regulations 1990 (S.I. 1990/944)
 Control of Pollution (Clyde River Purification Board Act 1972) Amendment Order 1990 (S.I. 1990/945)
 Injuries in War (Shore Employments) Compensation (Amendment) Scheme 1990 (S.I. 1990/946)
 Removal, Storage and Disposal of Vehicles (Prescribed Sums and Charges etc.) (Amendment) Regulations 1990 (S.I. 1990/955)
 Local Authorities (Councillors) (Declaration of Acceptance of Office) (Scotland) Order 1990 (S.I. 1990/956)
 County of Clwyd (Electoral Arrangements) Order 1990 (S.I. 1990/957)
 Seed Potatoes (Fees) Regulations 1990 (S.I. 1990/958)
 Local Government and Housing Act 1989 (Commencement No. 7) Order 1990 (S.I. 1990/961)
 London-Portsmouth Trunk Road A3 (Ham Barn-Petersfield Section Slip Roads) (Variation) Order 1990 (S.I. 1990/962)
 London–Portsmouth Trunk Road A3 (Liphook–Ham Barn Section Slip Roads) (Part 2) Order 1990 (S.I. 1990/963)
 London-Portsmouth Trunk Road A3 (Liphook-Ham Barn Section) (Parts 2: Headley Road to Queens Road) Order 1990 (S.I. 1990/964)
 London-Portsmouth Trunk Road A3 (Liphook-Petersfield Section Detrunking) Order 1990 (S.I. 1990/965)
 County Council of West Glamorgan (A4217 Cross-Valley Link at Pentrechwyth Classified Road) (Construction of Bridge Over Navigable Waters) Scheme 1989 Confirmation Instrument 1990 (S.I. 1990/972)
 Offshore Installations (Safety Zones) (No. 4) Order 1990 (S.I. 1990/973)
 Antarctic Treaty (Contracting Parties) Order 1990 (S.I. 1990/989)
 Marshall Scholarships Order 1990 (S.I. 1990/990)
 St. Helena Court of Appeal (Appeal to Privy Council) (Amendment) Order 1990 (S.I. 1990/991)
 Football Spectators (Corresponding Offences in Italy) Order 1990 (S.I. 1990/992)
 Football Spectators (Corresponding Offences in Scotland) Order 1990 (S.I. 1990/993)
 Transport (Amendment) (Northern Ireland) Order 1990 (S.I. 1990/994)
 Diving Operations at Work (Amendment) Regulations 1990 (S.I. 1990/996)
 Scotch Whisky Act 1988 (Commencement and Transitional Provisions) Order 1990 (S.I. 1990/997)
 Scotch Whisky Order 1990 (S.I. 1990/998)

1001-1100

 Gipsy Encampments (District of Dover) Order 1990 (S.I. 1990/1001)
 Gipsy Encampments (Metropolitan District of Bradford) Order 1990 (S.I. 1990/1002)
 Design Right (Semiconductor Topographies) (Amendment) Regulations 1990 (S.I. 1990/1003)
 Land Registration (Execution of Deeds) Rules 1990 (S.I. 1990/1010)
 Solicitors Disciplinary Tribunal (Increase in Penalty) Order 1990 (S.I. 1990/1011)
 Nitrate Sensitive Areas (Designation) Order 1990 (S.I. 1990/1013)
 Sea Fish Licensing (Variation) (No. 2) Order 1990 (S.I. 1990/1014)
 Renfrew and City of Glasgow Districts (Cowan Park and Salterland Road) Boundaries Amendment Order 1990 (S.I. 1990/1016)
 Police (Discipline) (Senior Officers) (Scotland) Regulations 1990 (S.I. 1990/1017)
 Banking Act 1987 (Exempt Transactions) (Amendment No. 2) Regulations 1990.S.I. 1990/1018)
 Housing (Change of Landlord) (Payment of Disposal Cost by Instalments) Regulations 1990 (S.I. 1990/1019)
 Public Service Vehicles (Conduct of Drivers, Inspectors, Conductors and Passengers) Regulations 1990 (S.I. 1990/1020)
 West Yorkshire Residuary Body (Transfer of Property etc.) Order 1990 (S.I. 1990/1024)
 Blood Tests (Evidence of Paternity) (Amendment) (No. 2) Regulations 1990 (S.I. 1990/1025)
 Public Telecommunication System Designation (Diamond Cable (Nottingham) Ltd) Order 1990 (S.I. 1990/1026)
 Stock Transfer (Gilt-edged Securities) (Exempt Transfer) (Amendment) Regulations 1990 (S.I. 1990/1027)
 Housing (Change of Landlord) (Amendment) Regulations 1990 (S.I. 1990/1033)
 Legal Aid (Scotland) (Fees in Civil Proceedings) Amendment (No.2) Regulations 1990 (S.I. 1990/1034)
 Criminal Legal Aid (Scotland) (Fees) Amendment (No. 2) Regulations 1990 (S.I. 1990/1035)
 Civil Legal Aid (Scotland) (Fees) Amendment (No.2) Regulations 1990 (S.I. 1990/1036)
 Advice and Assistance (Scotland) Amendment (No. 2) Regulations 1990 (S.I. 1990/1037)
 Legal Aid (Scotland) (Fees in Criminal Proceedings) Amendment Regulations 1990 (S.I. 1990/1038)
 Inter-American Development Bank (Seventh General Increase) Order 1990 (S.I. 1990/1042)
 Manston Airport Licensing (Liquor) Order 1990 (S.I. 1990/1043)
 Manston Airport Shops Order 1990 (S.I. 1990/1044)
 National Health Service (General Ophthalmic Services) (Scotland) Amendment Regulations 1990 (S.I. 1990/1048)
 National Health Service (General Ophthalmic Services) Amendment Regulations 1990 (S.I. 1990/1051)
 Import and Export (Plant Health Fees) (England and Wales) (Amendment) Order 1990 (S.I. 1990/1052)
 Housing (Change of Landlord) (Prescribed Forms) (Amendment) Regulations 1990 (S.I. 1990/1059)
 Returning Officer's Expenses (Northern Ireland) Regulations 1990 (S.I. 1990/1065)
 Electricity Act 1989 (Variation of Section 34(1)(a)) Order 1990 (S.I. 1990/1066)
 Rent Book (Forms of Notice) (Amendment) Regulations 1990 (S.I. 1990/1067)
 Rent Officers (Additional Functions) (No. 2)Order 1990 (S.I. 1990/1068)
 Agriculture (Tractor Cabs) (Amendment) Regulations 1990 (S.I. 1990/1075)
 London Cab Order 1990 (S.I. 1990/1076)
 River Spey Salmon Fishery District (Baits and Lures) Regulations 1990 (S.I. 1990/1080)
 Education (National Curriculum) (Attainment Targets and Programmes of Study in Welsh) Order 1990 (S.I. 1990/1082)
 Water (Target Investment Limit) Order 1990 (S.I. 1990/1083)
 Preserved Sardines (Marketing Standards) Regulations 1990 (S.I. 1990/1084)
 Education (Recognised Awards) (Amendment) Order 1990 (S.I. 1990/1085)
 Building Societies (Designation of Qualifying Bodies) (Amendment) (No. 4) Order 1990 (S.I. 1990/1089)
 Local Authorities (Borrowing) (Amendment) Regulations 1990 (S.I. 1990/1091)
 Oil Fuel (Sulphur Content of Gas Oil) Regulations 1990 (S.I. 1990/1096)
 Motor Fuel (Sulphur Content of Gas Oil) (Amendment) Regulations 1990 (S.I. 1990/1097)

1101-1200

 Road Transport (International Passenger Services) (Amendment) Regulations 1990 (S.I. 1990/1103)
 Heavy Goods Vehicles (Drivers' Licences) (Amendment) Regulations 1990 (S.I. 1990/1104)
 Public Service Vehicles (Drivers' Licences) (Amendment) Regulations 1990 (S.I. 1990/1105)
 Offshore Installations (Safety Zones) (No. 5) Order 1990 (S.I. 1990/1106)
 Self-Governing Schools etc. (Scotland) Act 1989 (Commencement No.2) Order 1990 (S.I. 1990/1108)
 Education (School Curriculum and Related Information) (Amendment) Regulations 1990 (S.I. 1990/1109)
 Inheritance Tax (Delivery of Accounts) Regulations 1990 (S.I. 1990/1110)
 Inheritance Tax (Delivery of Accounts) (Scotland) Regulations 1990 (S.I. 1990/1111)
 Inheritance Tax (Delivery of Accounts) (Northern Ireland) Regulations 1990 (S.I. 1990/1112)
 Motor Cars (Driving Instruction) (Amendment) Regulations 1990 (S.I. 1990/1113)
 Local Government Finance (Consequential Amendments) (Debt Administration) Order 1990 (S.I. 1990/1114)
 Motor Vehicles (Driving Licences) (Amendment) (No. 2) Regulations 1990 (S.I. 1990/1115)
 Gloucester Harbour Revision Order (Amendment) Order 1990 (S.I. 1990/1116)
 A16 Trunk Road (Great Grimsby Borough Boundary to Toll Bar Roundabout) (Detrunking) Order 1990 (S.I. 1990/1117)
 Export of Sheep (Prohibition) (No. 2) Amendment No. 2 Order 1990 (S.I. 1990/1120)
 Food Protection (Emergency Prohibitions) (England) Amendment No. 2 Order 1990 (S.I. 1990/1121)
 Medicines (Sale or Supply) (Miscellaneous Provisions) Amendment Regulations 1990 (S.I. 1990/1124)
 Farm and Conservation Grant (Amendment) Regulations 1990 (S.I. 1990/1125)
 Farm and Conservation Grant (Variation) Scheme 1990 (S.I. 1990/1126)
 Police (Amendment No. 2) Regulations 1990 (S.I. 1990/1127)
 York Waterworks (Constitution and Regulation) Order 1990 (S.I. 1990/1128)
 Medicines (Products Other Than Veterinary Drugs) (General Sale List) Amendment Order 1990 (S.I. 1990/1129)
 Public Telecommunication System Designation (United Artists Communications (London South) Plc) (Kingston and Richmond) Order 1990 (S.I. 1990/1130)
 Road Vehicles (Construction and Use) (Amendment) (No. 2) Regulations 1990 (S.I. 1990/1131)
 Preserved Sardines (Marketing Standards) (Scotland) Regulations 1990 (S.I. 1990/1139)
 Personal Pension Schemes (Advertisements) Regulations 1990 (S.I. 1990/1140)
 Personal and Occupational Pension Schemes (Miscellaneous Amendments) Regulations 1990 (S.I. 1990/1141)
 Personal and Occupational Pension Schemes (Miscellaneous Amendments) (No. 2) Regulations 1990 (S.I. 1990/1142)
 Personal and Occupational Pension Schemes (Perpetuities) Regulations 1990 (S.I. 1990/1143)
 Criminal Justice Act 1988 (Commencement No. 11) Order 1990 (S.I. 1990/1145)
 Company Auditors (Examinations) Regulations 1990 (S.I. 1990/1146)
 Town and Country Planning (Listed Buildings in Wales and Buildings in Conservation Areas in Wales) (Welsh Forms) Regulations 1990 (S.I. 1990/1147)
 Food Protection (Emergency Prohibitions) Amendment (No. 2) Order 1990 (S.I. 1990/1155)
 Bass (Specified Areas) (Prohibition of Fishing) Order 1990 (S.I. 1990/1156)
 Sea Fisheries Districts (Constitution of Committees) (Variation) Order 1990 (S.I. 1990/1157)
 National Dock Labour Board (Date of Dissolution) Order 1990 (S.I. 1990/1158)
 Insurance Companies (Legal Expenses Insurance) Regulations 1990 (S.I. 1990/1159)
 Insurance Companies (Legal Expenses Insurance) (Application for Authorisation) Regulations 1990 (S.I. 1990/1160)
 Food Protection (Emergency Prohibitions) (Wales) (No. 5) Amendment No. 2 Order 1990 (S.I. 1990/1161)
 London-Portsmouth Trunk Road A3 (Liphook-Ham Barn Section Slip Roads) (Part 1) Order 1988, Amendment Order 1990 (S.I. 1990/1162)
 Road Vehicles (Construction and Use) (Amendment) (No. 3) Regulations 1990 (S.I. 1990/1163)
 Highland Regional Council (River , Oykel Bridge) Water Order 1990 (S.I. 1990/1165)
 Income Support (General) Amendment No. 2 Regulations 1990 (S.I. 1990/1168)
 Pleasure Craft (Arrival and Report) Regulations 1990 (S.I. 1990/1169)
 Home-Grown Cereals Authority (Rate of Levy) Order 1990 (S.I. 1990/1170)
 Public Telecommunication System Designation (Videotron London Limited) (Lambeth and Southwark) Order 1990 (S.I. 1990/1171)
 Public Telecommunication System Designation (Videotron London Limited) (Wandsworth) Order 1990 (S.I. 1990/1172)
 Law of Property (Miscellaneous Provisions) Act 1989 (Commencement) Order 1990 (S.I. 1990/1175)
 Swindon—Oxford Trunk Road (A420) (Kingston Bagpuize with Southmoor Bypass) Order 1990 (S.I. 1990/1176)
 Personal Community Charge (Exemptions) (Qualifying Courses of Education) (Scotland) Regulations 1990 (S.I. 1990/1178)
 Spirit Drinks Regulations 1990 (S.I. 1990/1179)
 Anglian, Hartlepools and Mid Kent (Pipelaying and Other Works) (Codes of Practice) Order 1990 (S.I. 1990/1180)
 Insurance Companies (Credit Insurance) Regulations 1990 (S.I. 1990/1181)
 Public Telecommunication System Designation (Cable and Satellite Television Holdings Ltd) (West Glamorgan) Order 1990 (S.I. 1990/1182)
 Unitary Development Plans (Rotherham) (Appointed Day) Order 1990 (S.I. 1990/1183)
 Agricultural Levies (Terms of Payment) Regulations 1990 (S.I. 1990/1185)
 Motor Vehicles (Tests) (Amendment) (No. 3) Regulations 1990 (S.I. 1990/1186)
 Nitrate Sensitive Areas (Designation) (Amendment) Order 1990 (S.I. 1990/1187)
 Value Added Tax (Refund of Tax) (Revocation) Order 1990 (S.I. 1990/1188)
 Housing Renovation etc. Grants (Reduction of Grant) Regulations 1990 (S.I. 1990/1189)
 Magistrates' Courts (Civilian Fine Enforcement Officers) Rules 1990 (S.I. 1990/1190)
 Goods Vehicles (Operators' Licences) (Temporary Use in Great Britain) (Amendment) Regulations 1990 (S.I. 1990/1191)
 Goods Vehicles (Community Cabotage Authorisations) (Fees) Regulations 1990 (S.I. 1990/1192)
 Spirit Drinks (Scotland) Regulations 1990 (S.I. 1990/1196)
 Companies (Fees) (Amendment) Regulations 1990 (S.I. 1990/1197)
 Antarctic Treaty Act 1967 (Isle of Man) (Variation) Order 1990 (S.I. 1990/1198)
 Drug Trafficking Offences Act 1986 (Designated Countries and Territories) Order 1990 (S.I. 1990/1199)
 Industrial Training(Northern Ireland) Order 1990 (S.I. 1990/1200)

1201-1300

 Trial of the Pyx (Amendment) Order 1990 (S.I. 1990/1201)
 New Forest (Confirmation of Byelaws of the Verderers of the New Forest) Order 1990 (S.I. 1990/1202)
 European Economic Interest Grouping (Fees) (Amendment) Regulations 1990 (S.I. 1990/1203)
 Medicines (Fees Relating to Medicinal Products for Animal Use) Regulations 1990 (S.I. 1990/1205)
 Company Auditors (Recognition Orders) (Application Fees) Regulations 1990 (S.I. 1990/1206)
 Insurance Companies (Transfer of Long Term Business) Regulations 1990 (S.I. 1990/1207)
 Education (Welsh Medium Teacher Training Incentive Supplement) Regulations 1990 (S.I. 1990/1208)
 Medicines (Medicated Animal Feeding Stuffs) (Amendment) Regulations 1990 (S.I. 1990/1210)
 Stock Transfer (Gilt-edged Securities) (Exempt Transfer) Regulations 1990 (S.I. 1990/1211)
 Submarine Pipe-lines (Designated Owners) Order 1990 (S.I. 1990/1217)
 Submarine Pipe-lines (Designated Owners) (No. 2) Order 1990 (S.I. 1990/1218)
 Submarine Pipe-lines (Designated Owners) (No. 3) Order 1990 (S.I. 1990/1219)
 Submarine Pipe-lines (Designated Owners) (No. 4) Order 1990 (S.I. 1990/1220)
 Submarine Pipe-lines (Designated Owners) (No. 5) Order 1990 (S.I. 1990/1221)
 Submarine Pipe-lines (Designated Owners) (No. 6) Order 1990 (S.I. 1990/1222)
 British Railways Board (Central Wales Railway) Light Railway (Amendment) Order 1990 (S.I. 1990/1223)
 Agricultural or Forestry Tractors and Tractor Components (Type Approval) (Fees) (Amendment) Regulations 1990 (S.I. 1990/1231)
 Housing Renovation etc. Grants (Prescribed Forms and Particulars) Regulations 1990 (S.I. 1990/1236)
 Gipsy Encampments (District of Richmondshire) Order 1990 (S.I. 1990/1239)
 Slaughter of Animals (Humane Conditions) (Scotland) Regulations 1990 (S.I. 1990/1240)
 London Docklands Development Corporation (Vesting of Land) (London Borough of Southwark) Order 1989 Approved by both Houses of ParliamentS.I. 1990/1241)
 Slaughter of Animals (Humane Conditions) Regulations 1990 (S.I. 1990/1242)
 Slaughter of Poultry (Humane Conditions) (Amendment) Regulations 1990 (S.I. 1990/1243)
 The Mendip (Parishes) Order 1990 S.I. 1990/1244
 Merchant Shipping (Fees) (Amendment) Regulations 1990 (S.I. 1990/1254)
 Classification, Packaging and Labelling of Dangerous Substances (Amendment) Regulations 1990 (S.I. 1990/1255)
 Fees in the Department of the Registers of Scotland (Amendment) Order 1990 (S.I. 1990/1256)
 Act of Sederunt (Rules of the Court of Session Amendment No.4) (Solicitors' Fees) 1990 (S.I. 1990/1262)
 Inner London Juvenile Courts (Selection of Chairmen) Order 1990 (S.I. 1990/1265)
 Petty Sessional Divisions (Bedfordshire) Order 1990 (S.I. 1990/1266)
 London-Portsmouth Trunk Road A3 (Liphook-Ham Barn Section Slip Roads) (Part 3) Order 1990 (S.I. 1990/1269)
 Suppression of Terrorism Act 1978 (Designation of Countries) Order 1990 (S.I. 1990/1272)
 Local Authorities (Capital Finance) (Amendment) Regulations 1990 (S.I. 1990/1273)
 Local Government and Housing Act 1989 (Commencement No. 8 and Transitional Provisions) Order 1990 (S.I. 1990/1274)
 Petty Sessional Divisions (Berkshire) Order 1990 (S.I. 1990/1275)
 Corn Returns (Scotland) (Variation) Regulations 1990 (S.I. 1990/1276)
 School Boards (Financial Information) (Scotland) Regulations 1990 (S.I. 1990/1277)
 Higher Education (Wales) Regulations 1990 (S.I. 1990/1278)
 Education (School Teachers' Pay and Conditions) Order 1990 (S.I. 1990/1281)
 Housing (Right to Buy) (Designated Rural Areas and Designated Regions) (England) Order 1990 (S.I. 1990/1282)
 Local Government Superannuation (Scotland) Amendment (No.2) Regulations 1990 (S.I. 1990/1284)
 Local Government Finance (Miscellaneous Amendments and Repeal) Order 1990 (S.I. 1990/1285)
 Social Security (Local Councillors) Amendment Regulations 1990 (S.I. 1990/1286)
 Income Tax (Interest Relief) (Qualifying Lenders) Order 1990 (S.I. 1990/1298)
 Personal Injuries (Civilians) Amendment (No. 2) Scheme 1990 (S.I. 1990/1300)

1301-1400

 Police (Dispensation from Requirement to Investigate Complaints) Regulations 1990 (S.I. 1990/1301)
 Leicester-Great Yarmouth Trunk Road (A47) (Etling Green Junction Improvement Slip Road) Order 1990 (S.I. 1990/1302)
 European Communities (Designation) (No. 2) Order 1990 (S.I. 1990/1304)
 Appropriation (No. 2)(Northern Ireland) Order 1990 (S.I. 1990/1305)
 Extradition (Suppression of Terrorism) (Amendment) Order 1990 (S.I. 1990/1306)
 Parliamentary Constituencies (England) (Miscellaneous Changes) Order 1990 (S.I. 1990/1307)
 Naval, Military and Air Forces etc. (Disablement and Death) Service Pensions Amendment (No. 2) Order 1990 (S.I. 1990/1308)
 Cable (Prescribed Diffusion Service) Order 1990 (S.I. 1990/1309)
 Nursing Homes Registration (Scotland)S.I. 1990/1310)
 Central Institutions (Recognition) (Scotland) Regulations 1990 (S.I. 1990/1311)
 Police (Scotland) Amendment (No. 2) Regulations 1990 (S.I. 1990/1312)
 Employment Subsidies Act 1978 (Renewal) (Great Britain) Order 1990 (S.I. 1990/1313)
 Home-Grown Cereals Authority Levy (Variation) Scheme (Approval) Order 1990 (S.I. 1990/1316)
 Home-Grown Cereals Authority Oilseeds Levy Scheme (Approval) Order 1990 (S.I. 1990/1317)
 Electricity (Restrictive Trade Practices Act 1976) (Exemptions) (No. 2) Order 1990 (S.I. 1990/1319)
 London North Circular Trunk Road (A406) and the London—Cambridge—King's Lynn Trunk Road (A10) (Enfield) (Speed Limits) Order 1990 (S.I. 1990/1320)
 Ungraded Eggs (Hygiene) Regulations 1990 (S.I. 1990/1323)
 National Health Service and Community Care Act 1990 (Commencement No. 1) Order 1990 (S.I. 1990/1329)
 Family Health Services Authorities (Membership and Procedure) Regulations 1990 (S.I. 1990/1330)
 Regional and District Health Authorities (Membership and Procedure) Regulations 1990 (S.I. 1990/1331)
 Petroleum (Production) (Seaward Areas) (Amendment) Regulations 1990 (S.I. 1990/1332)
 Insurance Companies (Amendment) Regulations 1990 (S.I. 1990/1333)
 A40 Trunk Road (Western Avenue, Hillingdon) (Prescribed Routes) Order 1990 (S.I. 1990/1334)
 Local Government and Housing Act 1989 (Commencement No. 8 and Transitional Provisions) (Amendment) Order 1990 (S.I. 1990/1335)
 Ungraded Eggs (Hygiene) (Scotland) Regulations 1990 (S.I. 1990/1336)
 Pilotage Act 1987 (Pilotage Commission: Transfer of Property, Rights and Liabilities) Order 1990 (S.I. 1990/1338)
 Thames Water Utilities Limited (Local Statutory Provisions) (Consequential Repeals) Order 1990 (S.I. 1990/1339)
 St Mary's Music School (Aided Places) Amendment Regulations 1990 (S.I. 1990/1345)
 Education (Assisted Places) (Scotland) Amendment Regulations 1990 (S.I. 1990/1346)
 Education Authority Bursaries (Scotland) Amendment Regulations 1990 (S.I. 1990/1347)
 Students' Allowances (Scotland) Amendment Regulations 1990 (S.I. 1990/1348)
 War Pensions Committees Regulations 1990 (S.I. 1990/1349)
 Corn Returns (Variation) Regulations 1990 (S.I. 1990/1351)
 Fodder Plant Seeds (Amendment) Regulations 1990 (S.I. 1990/1352)
 Seeds (National Lists of Varieties) (Amendment) Regulations 1990 (S.I. 1990/1353)
 Northumbria Regional Flood Defence Committee (Appointed Day) Order 1990 (S.I. 1990/1354)
 Southern Regional Flood Defence Committee (Appointed Day) Order 1990 (S.I. 1990/1355)
 South West Regional Flood Defence Committee (Appointed Day) Order 1990 (S.I. 1990/1356)
 Yorkshire Regional Flood Defence Committee (Appointed Day) Order 1990 (S.I. 1990/1357)
 Building (Procedure) (Scotland) Amendment Regulations 1990 (S.I. 1990/1358)
 Land Registration Act 1988 (Commencement) Order 1990 (S.I. 1990/1359)
 Land Registration (Matrimonial Homes) Rules 1990 (S.I. 1990/1360)
 Land Registration (Official Searches) Rules 1990 (S.I. 1990/1361)
 Land Registration (Open Register) Rules 1990 (S.I. 1990/1362)
 Common Agricultural Policy (Wine) Regulations 1990 (S.I. 1990/1363)
 Road Traffic Accidents (Payments for Treatment) Order 1990 (S.I. 1990/1364)
 Companies (Fees) (Amendment No. 2) Regulations 1990 (S.I. 1990/1368)
 Community Health Councils (Amendment) Regulations 1990 (S.I. 1990/1375)
 Enduring Powers of Attorney (Prescribed Form) Regulations 1990 (S.I. 1990/1376)
 Health and Safety (Training for Employment) Regulations 1990 (S.I. 1990/1380)
 Education (Individual Pupils' Achievements) (Information) Regulations 1990 (S.I. 1990/1381)
 Lands Tribunal (Amendment) Rules 1990 (S.I. 1990/1382)
 Food Safety Act 1990 (Commencement No. 1) Order 1990 (S.I. 1990/1383)
 Home Purchase Assistance (Recognised Lending Institutions) Order 1990 (S.I. 1990/1387)
 Housing (Right to Buy) (Priority of Charges)Order 1990 (S.I. 1990/1388)
 Mortgage Indemnities (Recognised Bodies)Order 1990 (S.I. 1990/1389)
 Food Protection (Emergency Prohibitions) (Lead in Cattle) (England) Order 1990 (S.I. 1990/1391)
 Companies Act 1989 (Commencement No. 6 and Transitional and Saving Provisions) Order 1990 (S.I. 1990/1392)
 Companies (Fair Dealing by Directors) (Increase in Financial Limits) Order 1990 (S.I. 1990/1393)
 Companies (Unregistered Companies) (Amendment No. 2) Regulations 1990 (S.I. 1990/1394)
 Definition of Subsidiary (Consequential Amendments) Regulations 1990 (S.I. 1990/1395)
 Motor Vehicles (Driving Licences) (Amendment) (No. 3) Regulations 1990 (S.I. 1990/1396)
 Copyright, Designs and Patents Act 1988 (Commencement No. 5) Order 1990 (S.I. 1990/1400)

1401-1500

 Education (Student Loans) Regulations 1990 (S.I. 1990/1401)
 Public Telecommunication System Designation (East Coast Cable Ltd) (Ipswich and Colchester) Order 1990 (S.I. 1990/1402)
 A590 Greenodd to Barrow-in-Furness Trunk Road (Improvement at Melton Terrace) Order 1990 (S.I. 1990/1403)
 Greenodd to Barrow-in-Furness Trunk Road (A590 Dalton-in-Furness Bypass) Order 1990 (S.I. 1990/1404)
 Greenodd to Barrow-in-Furness Trunk Road (A590 Dalton-in-Furness Bypass) (Detrunking) Order 1990 (S.I. 1990/1405)
 Park Road (East of Oak Lea Road to North Road) (Trunking) Order 1990 (S.I. 1990/1406)
 National Health Service (Appointment of Consultants) Amendment Regulations 1990 (S.I. 1990/1407)
 A59 Trunk Road Mellor Brook (Detrunking) Order 1990 (S.I. 1990/1409)
 Samlesbury—Skipton Trunk Road (A59 Mellor Brook Bypass) Order 1990 (S.I. 1990/1410)
 Coal Industry (Restructuring Grants) Order 1990 (S.I. 1990/1411)
 Social Security Revaluation of Earnings Factors Order 1990 (S.I. 1990/1412)
 Community Charges (Administration and Enforcement) (Amendment) (No. 2) Regulations 1990 (S.I. 1990/1426)
 Copyright (Material Open to Public Inspection) (Marking of Copies of Plans and Drawings) Order 1990 (S.I. 1990/1427)
 Opencast Coal (Rate of Interest on Compensation) (No. 2) Order 1990 (S.I. 1990/1429)
 Food Hygiene (Amendment) Regulations 1990 (S.I. 1990/1431)
 Education (Reorganisation in Inner London) (Redundancy Payments) (Amendment) Order 1990 (S.I. 1990/1432)
 Education (Reorganisation in Inner London) (Compensation) (Amendment) Regulations 1990 (S.I. 1990/1433)
 Building Societies (Designation of Qualifying Bodies) Order 1990 (S.I. 1990/1434)
 Charge Limitation (England) (Maximum Amount) Order 1990 (S.I. 1990/1435)
 Charge Limitation (England) (Maximum Amount) (No. 2) Order 1990 (S.I. 1990/1436)
 Charge Limitation (England) (Maximum Amount) (No. 3) Order 1990 (S.I. 1990/1437)
 Church of England (Legal Aid) Rules 1990 (S.I. 1990/1438)
 Ecclesiastical Judges and legal Officers (Fees) Order 1990 (S.I. 1990/1439)
 Legal Officers (Annual Fees) Order 1990 (S.I. 1990/1440)
 Parochial Fees Order 1990 (S.I. 1990/1441)
 Northern Ireland Act 1974 (Interim Period Extension) Order 1990 (S.I. 1990/1442)
 Leicester—Great Yarmouth Trunk Road (A47)(Narborough Bypass) Order 1990 (S.I. 1990/1443)
 Welfare of Livestock Regulations 1990 Approved by both Houses of ParliamentS.I. 1990/1445)
 Social Security Act 1990 (Commencement No. 1) Order 1990 (S.I. 1990/1446)
 Local Government (Politically Restricted Posts) (No. 2) Regulations 1990 (S.I. 1990/1447)
 Police and Criminal Evidence Act 1984 (Application to Armed Forces) (Amendment) Order 1990 (S.I. 1990/1448)
 Glasgow to Carlisle Motorway (M74) (River Sark to Guards Mill Section) Scheme 1990 (S.I. 1990/1450)
 Inshore Fishing (Birch Point, Firth of Clyde) (Prohibition of Fishing) Order 1990 (S.I. 1990/1451)
 Portsmouth (Camber Dock and Flathouse Wharf) Harbour Revision Order 1990 (S.I. 1990/1452)
 Design Right (Proceedings before Comptroller) (Amendment) Rules 1990 (S.I. 1990/1453)
 Patent Agents (Non-recognition of Certain Agents by Comptroller) Rules 1990 (S.I. 1990/1454)
 Patents (Amendment) Rules 1990 (S.I. 1990/1455)
 Registered Designs (Amendment) Rules 1990 (S.I. 1990/1456)
 Register of Patent Agents Rules 1990 (S.I. 1990/1457)
 Register of Trade Mark Agents Rules 1990 (S.I. 1990/1458)
 Trade Marks and Service Marks (Amendment) Rules 1990 (S.I. 1990/1459)
 Supreme Court Fees (Amendment) Order 1990 (S.I. 1990/1460)
 Agricultural Holdings (Form of Award in Arbitration Proceedings) Order 1990 (S.I. 1990/1472)
 Department of Trade and Industry (Fees) (Amendment) Order 1990 (S.I. 1990/1473)
 Assured Tenancies and Agricultural Occupancies (Rent Information) (Amendment) Order 1990 (S.I. 1990/1474)
 Legal Advice and Assistance (Scope) (Amendment) Regulations 1990 (S.I. 1990/1477)
 Local Government Act 1988 (Defined Activities) (Competition and Specified Periods) (Scotland) Regulations 1990 (S.I. 1990/1484)
 Local Government Act 1988 (Defined Activities) (Exemptions) (Scotland) Amendment Order 1990 (S.I. 1990/1485)
 Abolition of Domestic Rates (Domestic and Part Residential Subjects) (No.2) (Scotland) Regulations 1990 (S.I. 1990/1486)
 Social Security (Unemployment, Sickness and Invalidity Benefit) Amendment Regulations 1990 (S.I. 1990/1487)
 Electricity (Restrictive Trade Practices Act 1976) (Exemptions) (No. 3) Order 1990 (S.I. 1990/1490)
 Financial Services Act 1986 (Electricity Industry Exemptions) Order 1990 (S.I. 1990/1492)
 Financial Services Act 1986 (Restriction of Scope of Act and Meaning of Collective Investment Scheme)(No. 2) Order 1990 (S.I. 1990/1493)
 Food Protection (Emergency Prohibitions) (England) Amendment No. 3 Order 1990 (S.I. 1990/1494)
 County Court (Amendment No. 2) Rules 1990 (S.I. 1990/1495)
 Patents County Court (Designation and Jurisdiction) Order 1990 (S.I. 1990/1496)
 Public Record Office (Fees) Regulations 1990 (S.I. 1990/1497)
 Local Government Act 1988 (Defined Activities) (Competition) (Wales) Regulations 1990 (S.I. 1990/1498)
 Local Government Act 1988 (Defined Activities) (Exemptions) (Wales) (Amendment) Order 1990 (S.I. 1990/1499)
 Highways (Road Humps) (Amendment) Regulations 1990 (S.I. 1990/1500)

1501-1600

 Army, Air Force and Naval Discipline Acts (Continuation) Order 1990 (S.I. 1990/1501)
 British Nationality (Namibia) Order 1990 (S.I. 1990/1502)
 Child Abduction and Custody (Parties to Conventions) Order 1990 (S.I. 1990/1503)
 Companies (No. 2) (Northern Ireland) Order 1990 (S.I. 1990/1504)
 Copyright, Designs and Patents Act 1988 (Isle of Man) Order 1990 (S.I. 1990/1505)
 Education (Student Loans) (Northern Ireland) Order 1990 (S.I. 1990/1506)
 European Convention on Extradition Order 1990 (S.I. 1990/1507)
 Horse Racing (Northern Ireland) Order 1990 (S.I. 1990/1508)
 Pensions (Miscellaneous Provisions) (Northern Ireland) Order 1990 (S.I. 1990/1509)
 Planning and Building Regulations (Amendment) (Northern Ireland) Order 1990 (S.I. 1990/1510)
 Social Security (Northern Ireland) Order 1990 (S.I. 1990/1511)
 Copyright (Status of Former Dependent Territories) Order 1990 (S.I. 1990/1512)
 Films Co-Production Agreements (Amendment) Order 1990 (S.I. 1990/1513)
 Air Navigation (Noise Certification) Order 1990 (S.I. 1990/1514)
 Planning (Listed Buildings and Conservation Areas) Regulations 1990 (S.I. 1990/1519)
 National Health Service and Community Care Act 1990 (Commencement No.2) (Scotland) Order 1990 (S.I. 1990/1520)
 Food Protection (Emergency Prohibitions) (Wales)(No. 5) Amendment No. 3 Order 1990 (S.I. 1990/1523)
 Education (Special Educational Needs) (Amendment) Regulations 1990 (S.I. 1990/1524)
 Authorities for London Post-Graduate Teaching Hospitals (Constitution) Order 1990 (S.I. 1990/1525)
 Authorities for London Post-Graduate Teaching Hospitals Regulations 1990 (S.I. 1990/1526)
 Aerodromes (Designation) (Detention and Sale of Aircraft) Order 1990 (S.I. 1990/1527)
 Banking Act 1987 (Exempt Transactions) (Amendment No. 3) Regulations 1990 (S.I. 1990/1529)
 Occupational Pension Schemes (Transitional Provisions and Savings) Regulations 1990 (S.I. 1990/1530)
 Education (National Curriculum) (Attainment Targets and Programmes of Study in Technology) (Amendment) Order 1990 (S.I. 1990/1531)
 Assured Tenancies and Agricultural Occupancies (Forms) (Amendment) Regulations 1990 (S.I. 1990/1532)
 Rainhill Stoops to Queensway Trunk Road (A568 Widnes Eastern Bypass and Slip Roads) Order 1990 (S.I. 1990/1533)
 Education (Access Funds) (Scotland) Regulations 1990 (S.I. 1990/1534)
 Food Protection (Emergency Prohibitions) Amendment (No.3) Order 1990 (S.I. 1990/1535)
 Life Assurance (Apportionment of Receipts of Participating Funds) (Applicable Percentage) Order 1990 (S.I. 1990/1541)
 The Teignbridge (Parishes) Order 1990 S.I. 1990/1542
 Education (National Curriculum) (Assessment Arrangements for English, Mathematics and Science) Order 1990 (S.I. 1990/1543)
 Combined Probation Areas (Bedfordshire)Order 1990 (S.I. 1990/1544)
 Education (Assisted Places) (Amendment) Regulations 1990 (S.I. 1990/1546)
 Education (Assisted Places) (Incidental Expenses) (Amendment) Regulations 1990 (S.I. 1990/1547)
 Education (Grants) (Music and Ballet Schools) (Amendment) Regulations 1990 (S.I. 1990/1548)
 Social Security Benefits (Student Loans and Miscellaneous Amendments) Regulations 1990 (S.I. 1990/1549)
 Weights and Measures (Various Foods) (Amendment) Order 1990 (S.I. 1990/1550)
 School Pupil Records (Scotland) Regulations 1990 (S.I. 1990/1551)
 Local Government and Housing Act 1989 (Commencement No. 9 and Saving) Order 1990 (S.I. 1990/1552)
 Local Government (Committees and Political Groups) Regulations 1990 (S.I. 1990/1553)
 Justices of the Peace (Size and Chairmanship of Bench) Rules 1990 (S.I. 1990/1554)
 Education (Further and Higher Education Institutions Access Funds) Regulations 1990 (S.I. 1990/1555)
 Sheep Scab (National Dip) Order 1990 (S.I. 1990/1557)
 Social Security (Recoupment) Amendment Regulations 1990 (S.I. 1990/1558)
 Seed Potatoes (Fees) (Scotland) Regulations 1990 (S.I. 1990/1559)
 Further Education Student Records (Scotland) Regulations 1990 (S.I. 1990/1560)
 Education (Teachers) (Amendment) Regulations 1990 (S.I. 1990/1561)
 Town and Country Planning (Control of Advertisements) (Amendment) (No. 2) Regulations 1990 (S.I. 1990/1562)
 EEC Merger Control(Consequential Provisions) Regulations 1990 (S.I. 1990/1563)
 Local Government Act 1988 (Defined Activities) (Competition) (England) Regulations 1990 (S.I. 1990/1564)
 Local Government Act 1988 (Defined Activities) (Exemptions) (England) (Amendment) Order 1990 (S.I. 1990/1565)
 Central Rating Lists (Amendment) (No. 2) Regulations 1990 (S.I. 1990/1566)
 London Docklands Development Corporation (Planning Functions) Order 1990 (S.I. 1990/1567)
 Merseyside Development Corporation (Planning Functions) Order 1990 (S.I. 1990/1568)
 A20 Trunk Road (Sidcup Road, Greenwich) (Prohibition of Use of Gap in Central Reservation) Order 1990 (S.I. 1990/1569)
 Criminal Justice Act 1988 (Confiscation Orders) Order 1990 (S.I. 1990/1570)
 Police Cadets (Scotland) Amendment Regulations 1990 (S.I. 1990/1571)
 Police (Amendment No. 3) Regulations 1990 (S.I. 1990/1573)
 Police Cadets (Amendment) Regulations 1990 (S.I. 1990/1574)
 Police Federation (Amendment) Regulations 1990 (S.I. 1990/1575)
 Prevention of Terrorism (Temporary Provisions)(Designated Ports) Order 1990 (S.I. 1990/1579)
 Limited Partnerships (Unrestricted Size) No. 2 Regulations 1990 (S.I. 1990/1580)
 Partnerships (Unrestricted Size) No. 6 Regulations 1990 (S.I. 1990/1581)
 Industrial Training Levy (Road Transport) Order 1990 (S.I. 1990/1582)
 Redundancy Payments (Merchant Seamen Exclusion)Order 1973 (Revocation) Order 1990 (S.I. 1990/1583)
 Milk and Dairies and Milk (Special Designation) (Charges) Regulations 1990 (S.I. 1990/1584)
 Special Road (Glan Conwy to Conwy Morfa) Regulations 1990 (S.I. 1990/1586)
 General Medical Council Preliminary Proceedings Committee and Professional Conduct Committee (Procedure) (Amendment) Rules Order of Council 1990 (S.I. 1990/1587)
 Export of Goods (Control) (Amendment No. 4) Order 1990 (S.I. 1990/1588)
 Diseases of Animals (Approved Disinfectants)(Amendment) (No. 2) Order 1990 (S.I. 1990/1589)
 Meat and Livestock Commission Levy (Variation) Scheme (Confirmation) Order 1990 (S.I. 1990/1590)
 Control of Gold, Securities, Payments and Credits (Kuwait) Directions 1990 (S.I. 1990/1591)
 Plant Breeders' Rights (Amendment) Regulations 1990 (S.I. 1990/1592)
 Plant Breeders' Rights (Festulolium) Scheme 1990 (S.I. 1990/1593)
 Plant Breeders' Rights (Miscellaneous Ornamental Plants) Scheme 1990 (S.I. 1990/1594)
 Plant Breeders' Rights (Oil and Fibre Plants) (Variation) Scheme 1990 (S.I. 1990/1595)
 Plant Breeders' Rights (Trees, Shrubs and Woody Climbers) (Variation) Scheme 1990 (S.I. 1990/1596)
 Dartford—Thurrock Crossing Tolls Order 1990 (S.I. 1990/1597)
 Dartford—Thurrock Crossing (Amendment) Regulations 1990 (S.I. 1990/1598)
 Education (Bursaries for Teacher Training) (Amendment) Regulations 1990 (S.I. 1990/1599)

1601-1700

 Control of Gold, Securities, Payments and Credits (Republic of Iraq) Directions 1990 (S.I. 1990/1616)
 Portsmouth Water (Constitution and Regulation) Order 1990 (S.I. 1990/1617)
 River Deveron Salmon Fishery District (Baits and Lures) Regulations 1990 (S.I. 1990/1618)
 A45 Trunk Road (Coventry Road and Daventry Road, Dunchurch) (De-Trunking) Order 1990 (S.I. 1990/1619)
 M45 Motorway (Thurlaston to Dunchurch Section) Connecting Roads Scheme 1990 (S.I. 1990/1620)
 Nurses, Midwives and Health Visitors (Midwives Training) Amendment Rules Approval Order 1990 (S.I. 1990/1624)
 Caribbean Territories (Control of Gold, Securities, Payments and Credits: Kuwait and Republic of Iraq)Order 1990 (S.I. 1990/1625)
 Potato Marketing Scheme (Amendment) Order 1990 (S.I. 1990/1626)
 Education (Mandatory Awards) Regulations 1990 (S.I. 1990/1628)
 Trade Effluents (Prescribed Processes and Substances) (Amendment) Regulations 1990 (S.I. 1990/1629)
 Gas (Alternative Method of Charge) Regulations 1990 (S.I. 1990/1634)
 Gas (Testing of Apparatus and Equipment) Regulations 1990 (S.I. 1990/1635)
 Local Government (Assistants for Political Groups) (Remuneration) Order 1990 (S.I. 1990/1636)
 College Councils (Scotland) (No.2) Regulations 1990 (S.I. 1990/1637)
 National Health Service (General Dental Services) (Miscellaneous Amendments) Regulations 1990 (S.I. 1990/1638)
 Education (National Curriculum)(Assessment Arrangements in English, Welsh, Mathematics and Science) (Wales) Order 1990 (S.I. 1990/1639)
 Export of Goods (Control) (Iraq and Kuwait Sanctions) Order 1990 (S.I. 1990/1640)
 Sea Fish Industry Authority (Levy Powers) Order 1990 (S.I. 1990/1641)
 Anglian Regional Flood Defence Committee (Appointed Day) Order 1990 (S.I. 1990/1642)
 Anglian Regional Flood Defence Committee Order 1990 (S.I. 1990/1643)
 North West Regional Flood Defence Committee (Appointed Day) Order 1990 (S.I. 1990/1644)
 Severn-Trent Regional Flood Defence Committee (Appointed Day) Order 1990 (S.I. 1990/1645)
 Wessex Regional Flood Defence Committee (Appointed Day) Order 1990 (S.I. 1990/1646)
 Wessex Regional Flood Defence Committee Order 1990 (S.I. 1990/1647)
 Cambridge, East Surrey, East Worcestershire and Yorkshire (Pipelaying and Other Works)(Codes of Practice) Order 1990 (S.I. 1990/1648)
 A12 Trunk Road (Eastern Avenue, Redbridge) (Prescribed Routes) Order 1990 (S.I. 1990/1649)
 Iraq and Kuwait (United Nations Sanctions) Order 1990 (S.I. 1990/1651)
 Iraq and Kuwait (United Nations Sanctions) (Dependent Territories) Order 1990 (S.I. 1990/1652)
 Education (Inner London Education Authority) (Transitional and Supplementary Provisions) (No. 3) Order 1990 (S.I. 1990/1653)
 Secretary of State's Traffic Orders (Procedure) (England and Wales) Regulations 1990 (S.I. 1990/1656)
 Income-Related Benefits Amendment Regulations 1990 (S.I. 1990/1657)
 Mid Kent Water (Constitution and Regulation) Order 1990 (S.I. 1990/1658)
 Portsmouth Flathouse Quay Harbour Revision Order 1990 (S.I. 1990/1659)
 Merger (Fees) Regulations 1990 (S.I. 1990/1660)
 National Health Service (Travelling Expenses and Remission of Charges) Amendment No. 2 Regulations 1990 (S.I. 1990/1661)
 National Health Service (Travelling Expenses and Remission of Charges) (Scotland) Amendment (No.2) Regulations 1990 (S.I. 1990/1665)
 Food Protection (Emergency Prohibitions) (Heavy Metal Poisoning) (England) Order 1990 (S.I. 1990/1666)
 Accounting Standards (Prescribed Body) Regulations 1990 (S.I. 1990/1667)
 Import and Export (Plant Health Fees) (Forestry) (Great Britain) Order 1990 (S.I. 1990/1668)
 Professions Supplementary to Medicine (Registration Rules) (Amendment) Order of Council 1990 (S.I. 1990/1669)
 Bristol, Rickmansworth, Sunderland and South Shields and Sutton (Pipelaying and Other Works) (Codes of Practice) Order 1990 (S.I. 1990/1670)
 Movements of Capital (Required Information) Regulations 1990 (S.I. 1990/1671)
 Telecommunication Apparatus (Approval Fees) (British Approvals Board for Telecommunications) Order 1990 (S.I. 1990/1679)
 Yorkshire Water Authority (Reconstitution of the Keyingham Level Drainage Board) Order 1989S.I. 1990/1680)
 Yorkshire Water Authority (Reconstitution of the Muston and Yedingham Drainage Board) Order 1989S.I. 1990/1681)
 Yorkshire Water Authority (Reconstitution of the Reedness and Swinefleet Drainage Board) Order 1990 (S.I. 1990/1682)
 Yorkshire Water Authority (Reconstitution of the Wilberfoss and Thornton Level Drainage Board) Order 1989S.I. 1990/1683)
 Yorkshire Water Authority (Reconstitution of the Winestead Level Drainage Board) Order 1989S.I. 1990/1684)
 Camden (Waiting and Loading Restriction) (Amendment No. 106) Order 1990 (S.I. 1990/1685)
 Rules of the Supreme Court (Amendment No. 2) 1990 (S.I. 1990/1689)
 Environmentally Sensitive Areas Designation (Wales) (Welsh Language Provisions) Order 1990 (S.I. 1990/1693)
 Protection of Wrecks (Designation No. 2)Order 1990 (S.I. 1990/1694)
 Building Societies (Transfer of Business) (Amendment) Regulations 1990 (S.I. 1990/1695)
 Agricultural Holdings (Units of Production) Order 1990 (S.I. 1990/1696)
 Patents (Fees) Rules 1990 (S.I. 1990/1697)
 Registered Designs (Fees) Rules 1990 (S.I. 1990/1698)
 Design Right (Proceedings before Comptroller)(Amendment) (No. 2) Rules 1990 (S.I. 1990/1699)
 New Towns (Transfer of Housing Stock) Regulations 1990 (S.I. 1990/1700)

1701-1800

 A41 Trunk Road (Finchley Road, Camden) (Prescribed Routes) Order 1990 (S.I. 1990/1701)
 A41 Trunk Road (Finchley Road, Camden) (Box Junctions) Order 1990 (S.I. 1990/1702)
 Companies Act 1989 (Commencement No. 7 and Transitional and Saving Provisions) Order 1990 (S.I. 1990/1707)
 Section 19 Minibus (Designated Bodies) (Amendment) Order 1990 (S.I. 1990/1708)
 Local Government Superannuation (Amendment)Regulations 1990 (S.I. 1990/1709)
 Local Government Act 1985 (Thames Water Authority Regional Land Drainage Committee) (Revocation) Order 1990 (S.I. 1990/1710)
 Thames Regional Flood Defence Committee (Appointed Day) Order 1990 (S.I. 1990/1711)
 Thames Regional Flood Defence Committee Order 1990 (S.I. 1990/1712)
 Local Authorities (Allowances) (Scotland) Amendment Regulations 1990 (S.I. 1990/1713)
 Personal Community Charge (Relief) (No. 2) (Scotland) Regulations 1990 (S.I. 1990/1714)
 EEC Merger Control (Distinct Market Investigations)Regulations 1990 (S.I. 1990/1715)
 Set-Aside (Amendment) Regulations 1990 (S.I. 1990/1716)
 Local Government (Allowances) (Amendment) Regulations 1990 (S.I. 1990/1717)
 Prescription Pricing Authority Constitution Order 1990 (S.I. 1990/1718)
 Prescription Pricing Authority Regulations 1990 (S.I. 1990/1719)
 Petty Sessional Divisions (Lincolnshire) Order 1990 (S.I. 1990/1720)
 M5 Birmingham-Exeter Motorway (Strensham Junction 8) Connecting Roads Scheme 1990 (S.I. 1990/1722)
 M5 Birmingham-Exeter Motorway (Warndon Junction 6) Connecting Roads Scheme 1990 (S.I. 1990/1723)
 M5 Birmingham-Exeter Motorway (Warndon Junction 6) Line Order 1990 (S.I. 1990/1724)
 M5 Birmingham–Exeter Motorway (Whittington Junction 7) Connecting Roads Scheme 1990 (S.I. 1990/1725)
 A65 Trunk Road (Heber to Holme House)(De-Trunking) Order 1990 (S.I. 1990/1726)
 A65 Trunk Road (Gargrave Bypass) Order 1990 (S.I. 1990/1727)
 Tryptophan in Food Regulations 1990 (S.I. 1990/1728)
 Housing (Revocation and Modification of Clearance Orders) Order 1990 (S.I. 1990/1729)
 Housing (Prescribed Forms) (No. 2) Regulations 1990 (S.I. 1990/1730)
 Child Resistant Packaging (Safety) (Amendment) Regulations 1990 (S.I. 1990/1736)
 Plant Health (Great Britain) (Amendment) Order 1990 (S.I. 1990/1741)
 National Health Service (Service Committees and Tribunal) Amendment (No.2) Regulations 1990 (S.I. 1990/1752)
 National Health Service (Fund-holding Practices) (Applications and Recognition) Regulations 1990 (S.I. 1990/1753)
 National Health Service (Fund-Holding Practices) (Applications and Recognition) (Scotland) Regulations 1990 (S.I. 1990/1754)
 National Health Service (Determination of Regions and Districts) Amendment Order 1990 (S.I. 1990/1755)
 National Health Service (District Health Authorities) Order 1990 (S.I. 1990/1756)
 National Health Service (General Medical and Pharmaceutical Services) Amendment (No. 2) Regulations 1990 (S.I. 1990/1757)
 Regional and District Health Authorities (Membership and Procedure) Amendment Regulations 1990 (S.I. 1990/1758)
 Public Telecommunication System Designation (Cambridge Cable Limited) (Cambridge) Order 1990 (S.I. 1990/1759)
 Prison (Amendment) Rules 1990 (S.I. 1990/1762)
 Young Offender Institution (Amendment) Rules 1990 (S.I. 1990/1763)
 County Court (Amendment No. 3) Rules 1990 (S.I. 1990/1764)
 Local Government Reorganisation (Miscellaneous Provisions) Order 1990 (S.I. 1990/1765)
 Companies (Forms Amendment No. 2 and Company's Type and Principal Business Activities) Regulations 1990 (S.I. 1990/1766)
 Export of Goods (Control) (Amendment No. 5) Order 1990 (S.I. 1990/1767)
 Iraq and Kuwait (United Nations Sanctions) (Amendment) Order 1990 (S.I. 1990/1768)
 Iraq and Kuwait (United Nations Sanctions)(Bermuda) Order 1990 (S.I. 1990/1769)
 Iraq and Kuwait (United Nations Sanctions) (Dependent Territories) (Amendment) Order 1990 (S.I. 1990/1770)
 Iraq and Kuwait (United Nations Sanctions) (Channel Islands) Order 1990 (S.I. 1990/1771)
 National Health Service (General Dental Services) (Miscellaneous Amendments) (Scotland) Regulations 1990 (S.I. 1990/1772)
 Community Charge Benefits (General) Amendment (No. 3) Regulations 1990 (S.I. 1990/1773)
 Family Credit (General) Amendment No. 2 Regulations 1990 (S.I. 1990/1774)
 Housing Benefit (General) Amendment (No. 2) Regulations 1990 (S.I. 1990/1775)
 Income Support (General) Amendment No. 3 Regulations 1990 (S.I. 1990/1776)
 Income Support (Liable Relatives) Regulations 1990 (S.I. 1990/1777)
 Social Security (Contributions) Amendment (No. 3) Regulations 1990 (S.I. 1990/1779)
 Petty Sessional Divisions (Essex) Order 1990 (S.I. 1990/1780)
 Petty Sessional Divisions (Wigan) Order 1990 (S.I. 1990/1781)
 Local Government (Direct Labour Organisations) (Competition) (Scotland) Regulations 1990 (S.I. 1990/1782)
 Local Government (Direct Labour Organisations) (Specified Number of Employed Persons) (Scotland) Order 1990 (S.I. 1990/1783)
 Dolgellau—South of Birkenhead Trunk Road (A 494)(Mold By-Pass) Order 1990 (S.I. 1990/1786)
 Social Fund (Miscellaneous Provisions) Regulations 1990 (S.I. 1990/1788)
 Food Protection (Emergency Prohibitions) (Copper or Other Metal Poisoning) (England) Order 1990 (S.I. 1990/1789)
 A423 Trunk Road (Sandford on Thames) Detrunking Order 1990 (S.I. 1990/1790)
 Home Energy Efficiency Grants Regulations 1990 (S.I. 1990/1791)
 Tryptophan in Food (Scotland) Regulations 1990 (S.I. 1990/1792)
 National Health Service and Community Care Act 1990 (Commencement No.3 and Transitional Provisions) (Scotland) Order 1990 (S.I. 1990/1793)
 Public Telecommunications System Designation (Mid Downs Cable Limited) (Crawley, Horley and Gatwick Airport) Order 1990 (S.I. 1990/1797)
 Public Telecommunication System Designation (Herts Cable Limited) (West Hertfordshire) Order 1990 (S.I. 1990/1798)
 Trade Marks and Service Marks(Amendment) (No. 2) Rules 1990 (S.I. 1990/1799)
 Trade Marks and Service Marks (Fees) Rules 1990 (S.I. 1990/1800)

1801-1900

 Trade Marks and Service Marks (Forms) (Amendment) Rules 1990 (S.I. 1990/1801)
 North West Regional Flood Defence Committee (Appointed Day) (No. 2) Order 1990 (S.I. 1990/1806)
 Cosmetic Products (Safety) (Amendment) Regulations 1990 (S.I. 1990/1812)
 Non-Domestic Rating (Alteration of Lists and Appeals) (Amendment) (No. 2) Regulations 1990 (S.I. 1990/1822)
 Assured and Protected Tenancies (Lettings to Students) (Amendment) Regulations 1990 (S.I. 1990/1825)
 Food Protection (Emergency Prohibitions) (Heavy Metal Poisoning) (England) (Revocation) Order 1990 (S.I. 1990/1827)
 Zebra Pedestrian Crossings (Amendment) Regulations 1990 (S.I. 1990/1828)
 Swansea—Manchester Trunk Road (A483) and the Shrewsbury—Dolgellau Trunk Road (A458) (Welshpool North—South Relief Road) (Variation) Order 1990 (S.I. 1990/1830)
 Motor Vehicles (Designation of Approval Marks)(Amendment) Regulations 1990 (S.I. 1990/1838)
 Motor Vehicles (Type Approval) (Great Britain) (Amendment) (No. 2) Regulations 1990 (S.I. 1990/1839)
 Enterprise and New Towns (Scotland) Act 1990 Commencement Order 1990 (S.I. 1990/1840)
 Firemen's Pension Scheme (Amendment) Order 1990 (S.I. 1990/1841)
 National Health Service (Audit of Accounts) (Transitional Provisions) Regulations 1990 (S.I. 1990/1842)
 Isles of Scilly (Variation) Order 1990 (S.I. 1990/1846)
 Goods Vehicles (Operators' Licences, Qualifications and Fees) (Amendment) Regulations 1990 (S.I. 1990/1849)
 Operation of Public Service Vehicles (Partnership) (Amendment) Regulations 1990 (S.I. 1990/1850)
 Public Service Vehicle Operators (Qualifications) Regulations 1990 (S.I. 1990/1851)
 Public Service Vehicles (Operators' Licences) (Amendment) Regulations 1990 (S.I. 1990/1852)
 Annual Close Time (Rivers Irvine and Garnock Salmon Fishery District) Order 1990 (S.I. 1990/1854)
 Authorities for London Post-Graduate Teaching Hospitals (Constitution) Amendment Order 1990 (S.I. 1990/1855)
 Education (Training Grants) Regulations 1990 (S.I. 1990/1857)
 Public Telecommunication System Designation (Devon Cablevision Limited) (South Devon) Order 1990 (S.I. 1990/1858)
 Electricity (Non-Fossil Fuel Sources) (England and Wales) (No. 2) Order 1990 (S.I. 1990/1859)
 A516 Trunk Road (Etwall Bypass) Order 1990 (S.I. 1990/1864)
 A516 Trunk Road (Etwall Bypass) (Detrunking) Order 1990 (S.I. 1990/1865)
 Bovine Animals (Identification, Marking and Breeding Records) Order 1990 (S.I. 1990/1867)
 Movement of Animals (Records) (Amendment) Order 1990 (S.I. 1990/1868)
 Tuberculosis (England and Wales) (Amendment) Order 1990 (S.I. 1990/1869)
 Time Off for Public Duties Order 1990 (S.I. 1990/1870)
 Social Security (Attendance Allowance and Claims and Payments) Amendment Regulations 1990 (S.I. 1990/1871)
 Cheshire County Council (Shropshire Union Canal Tunnel, Chester) Scheme 1990 Confirmation Instrument 1990 (S.I. 1990/1872)
 Industrial Training (Construction Board) Order 1964(Amendment) Order 1990 (S.I. 1990/1873)
 A12 Trunk Road (Eastern Avenue, Havering)(Prescribed Routes) Order 1990 (S.I. 1990/1874)
 Public Telecommunication System Designation (City Centre Communications Ltd) (North West London) Order 1990 (S.I. 1990/1888)
 Public Telecommunication System Designation (Leicester Communications Limited) (Leicester and Loughborough) Order 1990 (S.I. 1990/1889)
 Social Security (Categorisation of Earners) Amendment Regulations 1990 (S.I. 1990/1894)

1901-2000

 Non-Domestic Rating (Payment of Interest) Regulations 1990 (S.I. 1990/1904)
 Special Hospitals Service Authority (Establishment and Constitution) Amendment Order 1990 (S.I. 1990/1905)
 Health and Safety (Fees) Regulations 1990 (S.I. 1990/1906)
 Tuberculosis (Scotland) Amendment Order 1990 (S.I. 1990/1908)
 Magistrates' Courts (Social Security Act 1986) (Transfer of Orders to maintain and Enforcement of Maintenance Orders) Rules 1990 (S.I. 1990/1909)
 Nuclear Installations Act 1965 (Repeal and Modifications) Regulations 1990 (S.I. 1990/1918)
 Combined Probation Areas (Lincolnshire)Order 1990 (S.I. 1990/1919)
 Oxfordshire County Council (Wallingford Bypass River Thames Bridge) Scheme 1989 Confirmation Instrument 1990 (S.I. 1990/1920)
 Gipsy Encampments (Borough of Hertsmere) Order 1990 (S.I. 1990/1927)
 Gipsy Encampments (District of East Cambridgeshire) Order 1990 (S.I. 1990/1928)
 Gipsy Encampments (London Borough of Harrow) Order 1990 (S.I. 1990/1929)
 Bovine Spongiform Encephalopathy (No. 2) Amendment Order 1990 (S.I. 1990/1930)
 Social Security (Contributions) Amendment (No.4) Regulations 1990 (S.I. 1990/1935)
 Export of Sheep (Prohibition) (No. 2) Amendment No. 3 Order 1990 (S.I. 1990/1936)
 Food Protection (Emergency Prohibitions) (England) Amendment No. 4 Order 1990 (S.I. 1990/1937)
 National Health Service (General Dental Services) (Miscellaneous Amendments) (No. 2) Regulations 1990 (S.I. 1990/1938)
 National Health Service (General Dental Services) (Miscellaneous Amendments) (Scotland) (No.2) Regulations 1990 (S.I. 1990/1940)
 Borough of Burnley (Electoral Arrangements) Order 1990 (S.I. 1990/1941)
 Social Security Act 1990 (Commencement No. 2) Order 1990 (S.I. 1990/1942)
 Value Added Tax (Cash Accounting) (Amendment) (No. 2) Regulations 1990 (S.I. 1990/1943)
 Food Protection (Emergency Prohibitions)(Wales) (No. 5) Amendment No. 4 Order 1990 (S.I. 1990/1948)
 Food Protection (Emergency Prohibitions) Amendment (No. 4) Order 1990 (S.I. 1990/1949)
 Local Government Reorganisation (Property)(West Midlands) Order 1990 (S.I. 1990/1954)
 Veterinary Surgeons and Veterinary Practitioners (Disciplinary Committee) (Procedure and Evidence) (Amendment) Rules Order of Council 1990 (S.I. 1990/1959)
 Import and Export (Plant Health Fees) (Scotland) Order 1990 (S.I. 1990/1960)
 East Anglian, Essex and York (Pipelaying and Other Works) (Codes of Practice) Order 1990 (S.I. 1990/1965)
 Partnership (Unrestricted Size) No. 7 Regulations 1990 (S.I. 1990/1969)
 Public Telecommunication System Designation(Derbyshire Cablevision Limited) (Derby) Order 1990 (S.I. 1990/1970)
 River Don Catchment Area (Part) Protection Order 1990 (S.I. 1990/1971)
 Act of Sederunt (Registration Appeal Court) 1990 (S.I. 1990/1972)
 British Railways (Penalty Fares) Act 1989 (Activating No. 1) Order 1990 (S.I. 1990/1973)
 Commission for the New Towns (Specified Date) (Tenancies) Order 1990 (S.I. 1990/1980)
 Road Vehicles (Construction and Use) (Amendment) (No. 4) Regulations 1990 (S.I. 1990/1981)
 Trustee Savings Banks Act 1985 (Appointed Day)(No. 7) Order 1990 (S.I. 1990/1982)
 Food Protection (Emergency Prohibitions) (Lead in Cattle) (England) (Revocation) Order 1990 (S.I. 1990/1983)
 Fire Safety and Safety of Places of Sport Act 1987 (Commencement No. 6) Order 1990 (S.I. 1990/1984)
 Merchant Shipping (Medical Examination) (Amendment) Regulations 1990 (S.I. 1990/1985)
 Personal Community Charge (Students)(Amendment) Regulations 1990 (S.I. 1990/1986)
 Iraq and Kuwait (United Nations Sanctions) (No. 2) Order 1990 (S.I. 1990/1987)
 Iraq and Kuwait (United Nations Sanctions) (Dependent Territories) (No. 2) Order 1990 (S.I. 1990/1988)
 Education (Grant) Regulations 1990 (S.I. 1990/1989)

2001-2100

 London Cab (No. 2) Order 1990 (S.I. 1990/2003)
 Revenue Support Grant (Specified Bodies) Regulations 1990 (S.I. 1990/2004)
 Copyright (Certification of Licensing Scheme for Educational Recording of Broadcasts) (Guild Sound and Vision Limited) (Revocation) Order 1990 (S.I. 1990/2007)
 Copyright (Certification of Licensing Scheme for Educational Recording of Broadcasts) (Open University Educational Enterprises Limited) Order 1990 (S.I. 1990/2008)
 Public Telecommunication System Designation(Cable Television Limited) (Borough of Northampton) Order 1990 (S.I. 1990/2011)
 Welfare Food Amendment (No. 3) Regulations 1990 (S.I. 1990/2012)
 A421 Trunk Road (Wendlebury to Bicester Section, Slip Roads) Order 1990 (S.I. 1990/2015)
 Civil List (Increase of Financial Provision) Order 1990 (S.I. 1990/2018)
 Annual Close Time (River Tay Salmon Fishery District) Order 1990 (S.I. 1990/2020)
 Occupational Pension Schemes (Modification) Regulations 1990 (S.I. 1990/2021)
 Charging Authorities (Notification of Precept Population) (Wales) (Amendment) Regulations 1990 (S.I. 1990/2022)
 Charging Authorities (Population for Precepts) (Wales) (Amendment) Regulations 1990 (S.I. 1990/2023)
 National Health Service Trusts (Membership and Procedure) Regulations 1990 (S.I. 1990/2024)
 Non-Domestic Rating (Alteration of Lists and Appeals) (Amendment) (No. 3) Regulations 1990 (S.I. 1990/2025)
 Control of Substances Hazardous to Health (Amendment) Regulations 1990 (S.I. 1990/2026)
 Fees for Inquiries (Standard Daily Amount) Regulations 1990 (S.I. 1990/2027)
 Land Registration Fees (No. 2) Order 1990 (S.I. 1990/2029)
 Education (Eligibility of Primary Schools for Grant-maintained Status) Order 1990 (S.I. 1990/2031)
 Town and Country Planning General Development (Amendment) (No. 2) Order 1990 (S.I. 1990/2032)
 International Carriage of Perishable Foodstuffs (Amendment) Regulations 1990 (S.I. 1990/2033)
 Food Protection (Emergency Prohibitions)(Copper or Other Metal Poisoning) (England) (Revocation) Order 1990 (S.I. 1990/2034)
 Overhead Lines (Exemption) Regulations 1990 (S.I. 1990/2035)
 Value Added Tax (Insurance) Order 1990 (S.I. 1990/2037)
 Industrial Training (Clothing and Allied Products Board) (Revocation) Order 1990 (S.I. 1990/2038)
 Local Government Act 1988 (Defined Activities) (Exemption) (England) (No. 3) Order 1990 (S.I. 1990/2039)
 The South Hams (Parishes) Order 1990 S.I. 1990/2040
 Sea Fish (Specified Manx Waters) Licensing Order 1990 (S.I. 1990/2051)
 Sea Fishing (Specified Western Waters) (Restrictions on Landing) Order 1990 (S.I. 1990/2052)
 Deposit Protection Board (Increase of Borrowing Limit) (No. 2) Order 1990 (S.I. 1990/2064)
 Occupational Pension Schemes (Independent Trustee) Regulations 1990 (S.I. 1990/2075)
 London—Brighton Trunk Road (A23 Bolney Flyover Slip Roads) Order 1990 (S.I. 1990/2080)
 Local Government Act 1988 (Defined Activities) (Competition) (England) (Amendment) Regulations 1990 (S.I. 1990/2082)
 Police Cadets (Scotland) Amendment (No.2) Regulations 1990 (S.I. 1990/2083)
 Criminal Justice Act 1988 (Commencement No. 12) Order 1990 (S.I. 1990/2084)
 Jam and Similar Products (Amendment) Regulations 1990 (S.I. 1990/2085)
 Petty Sessional Divisions (Cornwall) Order 1990 (S.I. 1990/2099)
 Petty Sessional Divisions (Somerset) Order 1990 (S.I. 1990/2100)

2101-2200

 Retirement Benefits Schemes (Continuation of Rights of Members of Approved Schemes) Regulations 1990 (S.I. 1990/2101)
 Testing in Primary Schools (Scotland) Regulations 1990 (S.I. 1990/2104)
 Act of Sederunt (Amendment of Sheriff Court Ordinary Cause, Summary Cause, and Small Claim, Rules) (No.2) 1990 (S.I. 1990/2105)
 Act of Adjournal (Consolidation Amendment No.2) (Miscellaneous) 1990 (S.I. 1990/2106)
 A1 Trunk Road (Gatenby Lane Junction, Leeming Slip Roads) Order 1990 (S.I. 1990/2112)
 Finance Act 1985 (Interest on Tax) (Prescribed Rate)(No. 2) Order 1990 (S.I. 1990/2113)
 A5 London—Holyhead Trunk Road (Little Brickhill Bypass and Slip Roads) Order 1990 (S.I. 1990/2114)
 A5 London—Holyhead Trunk Road (Little Brickhill) Detrunking Order 1990 (S.I. 1990/2115)
 Act of Sederunt (Applications under section 57C of the Social Security Pensions Act 1975) 1990 (S.I. 1990/2116)
 Offshore Installations (Safety Zones) (No. 6) Order 1990 (S.I. 1990/2117)
 Act of Sederunt (Rules of the Court of Session Amendment No.5) (Miscellaneous) 1990 (S.I. 1990/2118)
 Merchant Shipping (Load Line) (Amendment) Rules 1990 (S.I. 1990/2128)
 Value Added Tax (Charities) (No. 2) Order 1990 (S.I. 1990/2129)
 European Bank for Reconstruction and Development (Immunities and Privileges) Order 1990 (S.I. 1990/2142)
 European Communities (Designation) (No. 3)Order 1990 (S.I. 1990/2143)
 Iraq and Kuwait (United Nations Sanctions)(Second Amendment) Order 1990 (S.I. 1990/2144)
 Civil Aviation Act 1982 (Jersey) Order 1990 (S.I. 1990/2145)
 Education (Unrecognised Degrees) (Guernsey) Order 1990 (S.I. 1990/2146)
 Fishing Vessels (Life-Saving Appliances) (Guernsey) Order 1990 (S.I. 1990/2147)
 Fishing Vessels (Safety Provisions) (Guernsey)Order 1990 (S.I. 1990/2148)
 Local Government Boundaries Commissioner (Northern Ireland) Order 1990 (S.I. 1990/2149)
 Merchant Shipping (Safety Convention) (Guernsey) Order 1990 (S.I. 1990/2150)
 Prevention of Terrorism (Temporary Provisions) Act 1984 (Isle of Man) (Revocation) Order 1990 (S.I. 1990/2151)
 Double Taxation Relief (Taxes on Income) (Netherlands) Order 1990 (S.I. 1990/2152)
 Copyright (Application to Other Countries) (No. 2) (Amendment) Order 1990 (S.I. 1990/2153)
 Air Navigation (Amendment) Order 1990 (S.I. 1990/2154)
 Criminal Appeal (Amendment) Rules 1990 (S.I. 1990/2156)
 Crown Court (Amendment) Rules 1990 (S.I. 1990/2157)
 Credit Cards (Merchant Acquisition) Order 1990 (S.I. 1990/2158)
 Credit Cards (Price Discrimination) Order 1990 (S.I. 1990/2159)
 National Health Service Trusts(Membership and Procedure) Amendment Regulations 1990 (S.I. 1990/2160)
 Nursing Homes and Mental Nursing Homes (Amendment) Regulations 1990 (S.I. 1990/2164)
 Human Fertilisation and Embryology Act 1990 (Commencement No. 1) Order 1990 (S.I. 1990/2165)
 Channel Tunnel (Customs and Excise) Order 1990 (S.I. 1990/2167)
 Copyright, Designs and Patents Act 1988 (Commencement No. 6) Order 1990 (S.I. 1990/2168)
 Public Telecommunication System Designation(Coastal Cablevision of Dorset Ltd) (West Dorset)Order 1990 (S.I. 1990/2169)
 Courts and Legal Services Act 1990 (Commencement No. 1) Order 1990 (S.I. 1990/2170)
 Mid Southern, Northumbrian and Southern (Pipelaying and Other Works) (Codes of Practice) Order 1990 (S.I. 1990/2171)
 Newcastle and Gateshead Water (Constitution and Regulation) Order 1990 (S.I. 1990/2177)
 Sunderland and South Shields (Constitution and Regulation) Order 1990 (S.I. 1990/2178)
 Building Standards (Scotland) Regulations 1990 (S.I. 1990/2179)
 Jam and Similar Products (Scotland) Amendment Regulations 1990 (S.I. 1990/2180)
 Electricity (Amendment of Scottish Pension Schemes) Regulations 1990 (S.I. 1990/2181)
 River Nairn Salmon Fishery District (Baits and Lures) Regulations 1990 (S.I. 1990/2182)
 Road Vehicles (Registration and Licensing) (Amendment) Regulations 1990 (S.I. 1990/2185)
 Road Vehicles (Registration and Licensing) (Amendment) Regulations (Northern Ireland) 1990 (S.I. 1990/2186)
 Education (National Curriculum) (Exceptions) (Wales) Regulations 1990 (S.I. 1990/2187)
 Winchester—Preston Trunk Road (A34) (Stratford-upon-Avon) De-Trunking Order 1990 (S.I. 1990/2188)
 London-Portsmouth Trunk Road (A3 Milford Bypass and Slip Roads) Order 1990 (S.I. 1990/2189)
 London—Portsmouth Trunk Road (A3 Milford De-Trunking) (No. 2) Order 1990 (S.I. 1990/2190)
 London—Portsmouth Trunk Road (A3 Milford De-Trunking) Order 1990 (S.I. 1990/2191)
 Public Telecommunication System Designation (Jones Cable Group of South Hertfordshire Limited) Order 1990 (S.I. 1990/2192)

2201-2300

 (A69) Carlisle-Sunderland Trunk Road (Derwenthaugh to Scotswood Road De-Trunking) Order 1986 Amendment Order 1990 (S.I. 1990/2201)
 Edinburgh College of Art (Amendment) Order 1990 (S.I. 1990/2202)
 Building Societies (Investigation of Complaints) Order 1990 (S.I. 1990/2203)
 Medicines (Pharmacies) (Applications for Registration and Fees) Amendment Regulations 1990 (S.I. 1990/2204)
 Social Security (Miscellaneous Provisions)Amendment Regulations 1990 (S.I. 1990/2208)
 Social Security (Severe Disablement Allowance) Amendment Regulations 1990 (S.I. 1990/2209)
 British Nationality (Hong Kong) Act 1990 (Commencement) Order 1990 (S.I. 1990/2210)
 British Nationality (Hong Kong) (Registration of Citizens) Regulations 1990 (S.I. 1990/2211)
 Road Vehicles (Construction and Use) (Amendment) (No. 5) Regulations 1990 (S.I. 1990/2212)
 Veterinary Surgery (Blood Sampling) (Amendment) Order 1990 (S.I. 1990/2217)
 National Health Service and Community Care Act 1990 (Commencement No. 4 and Transitional Provision) Order 1990 (S.I. 1990/2218)
 Housing (Change of Landlord) (Payment of Disposal Cost by Instalments) (Amendment) Regulations 1990 (S.I. 1990/2219)
 Environmental Protection Act 1990 (Commencement No. 1) Order 1990 (S.I. 1990/2226)
 Channel Tunnel (Fire Services, Immigration and Prevention of Terrorism) Order 1990 (S.I. 1990/2227)
 Road Traffic (Driver Licensing and Information Systems) Act 1989 (Commencement No. 3) Order 1990 (S.I. 1990/2228)
 National Health Service (Local Health Councils) (Scotland) Regulations 1990 (S.I. 1990/2230)
 Income Tax (Building Societies) (Dividends and Interest) Regulations 1990 (S.I. 1990/2231)
 Income Tax (Deposit-takers) (Interest Payments)Regulations 1990 (S.I. 1990/2232)
 Town and Country Planning (Isles of Scilly) Order 1990 (S.I. 1990/2233)
 Financial Services Act 1986 (Electricity Industry Exemptions) (No. 2) Order 1990 (S.I. 1990/2235)
 Land Registration (Solicitor to H M Land Registry) Regulations 1990 (S.I. 1990/2236)
 Planning (Listed Buildings and Conservation Areas) (Isles of Scilly) Order 1990 (S.I. 1990/2237)
 Act of Sederunt (Applications under the Social Security Act 1986) 1990 (S.I. 1990/2238)
 Rules of the Air Regulations 1990 (S.I. 1990/2241)
 Housing (Grants for Fire Escapes in Houses in Multiple Occupation) (Prescribed Percentage) (Scotland) Order 1990 (S.I. 1990/2242)
 Environmental Protection Act 1990 (Commencement No. 2) Order 1990 (S.I. 1990/2243)
 Local Authority Social Services (Complaints Procedure) Order 1990 (S.I. 1990/2244)
 Water Byelaws (Milngavie Waterworks, Loch Katrine, Loch Arklet, Glen Finglas) Extension Order 1990 (S.I. 1990/2250)
 Government Stock (Amendment)Regulations 1990 (S.I. 1990/2253)
 Education (Schools and Further Education) (Amendment) Regulations 1990 (S.I. 1990/2259)
 Magistrates' Courts (Civilian Fine Enforcement Officers) (No. 2) Rules 1990 (S.I. 1990/2260)
 Social Security (Industrial Injuries)(Prescribed Diseases) Amendment Regulations 1990 (S.I. 1990/2269)
 Public Telecommunication System Designation (Cable Hackney and Islington Limited) Order 1990 (S.I. 1990/2270)
 Public Telecommunication System Designation (Southdown Cablevision Limited) Order 1990 (S.I. 1990/2271)
 Offshore Installations (Safety Zones) (No. 7) Order 1990 (S.I. 1990/2275)
 Statutory Nuisance (Appeals) Regulations 1990 (S.I. 1990/2276)
 Occupational and Personal Pension Schemes (Levy) Regulations 1990 (S.I. 1990/2277)
 Register of Occupational and Personal Pension Schemes Regulations 1990 (S.I. 1990/2278)
 Education (Grant-maintained Schools) (Finance) (Amendment) Regulations 1990 (S.I. 1990/2279)
 Local Government Act 1988 (Defined Activities)(Competition) (Wales) (No. 2) Regulations 1990 (S.I. 1990/2280)
 Local Government Act 1988 (Defined Activities) (Competition) (Scotland) Amendment Regulations 1990 (S.I. 1990/2286)
 A47 Trunk Road (East Dereham to North Tuddenham Improvement) Order 1990 (S.I. 1990/2287)
 Child Abduction and Custody (Parties to Conventions) (Amendment) Order 1990 (S.I. 1990/2289)
 European Commission and Court of Human Rights (Immunities and Privileges) (Amendment) Order 1990 (S.I. 1990/2290)
 Protection of Trading Interests Act 1980 (Hong Kong) Order 1990 (S.I. 1990/2291)
 British Nationality (Hong Kong) (Selection Scheme) Order 1990 (S.I. 1990/2292)
 Copyright, Designs and Patents Act 1988 (Isle of Man) (No. 2) Order 1990 (S.I. 1990/2293)
 Horses (Protective Headgear for Young Riders) (Northern Ireland) Order 1990 (S.I. 1990/2294)
 Patents Act 1977 (Isle of Man) (Variation)Order 1990 (S.I. 1990/2295)
 Prevention of Terrorism (Temporary Provisions) Act 1984 (Guernsey) (Revocation) Order 1990 (S.I. 1990/2296)
 Judicial Committee (General Appellate Jurisdiction) Rules (Amendment) Order 1990 (S.I. 1990/2297)
 Parliamentary Constituencies (Scotland) (Miscellaneous Changes) Order 1990 (S.I. 1990/2298)
 A27 Trunk Road (Crossbush Bypass) Order 1990 (S.I. 1990/2299)
 A27 Trunk Road (Crossbush Bypass Detrunking) Order 1990 (S.I. 1990/2300)

2301-2400

 A27 Trunk Road (Crossbush Bypass Slip Roads) Order 1990 (S.I. 1990/2301)
 Social Fund Cold Weather Payments (General) Amendment Regulations 1990 (S.I. 1990/2302)
 Crown Agents (Additional Powers) Order 1990 (S.I. 1990/2303)
 Plaice (Specified Sea Areas) (Prohibition of Fishing) Order 1990 (S.I. 1990/2304)
 Occupational Pensions (Revaluation) Order 1990 (S.I. 1990/2315)
 Portsmouth, Severn Trent and Wessex (Pipelaying and Other Works) (Codes of Practice) Order 1990 (S.I. 1990/2318)
 Crown Office Fees Order 1990 (S.I. 1990/2319)
 Income Support (General and Transitional) Amendment Regulations 1990 (S.I. 1990/2324)
 Control of Industrial Major Accident Hazards (Amendment) Regulations 1990 (S.I. 1990/2325)
 Medicines (Fees Relating to Medicinal Products for Human Use) Amendment (No. 2) Regulations 1990 (S.I. 1990/2326)
 Law Reform (Miscellaneous Provisions) (Scotland) Act 1990 Commencement (No.1) Order 1990 (S.I. 1990/2328)
 Non-Domestic Rating (Transitional Period) (Amendment and Further Provision) Regulations 1990 (S.I. 1990/2329)
 Guarantee Payments (Exemption) (No. 28)Order 1990 (S.I. 1990/2330)
 Motor Vehicles (Driving Licences) (Amendment) (No. 5) Regulations 1990 (S.I. 1990/2334)
 Care of Cathedrals Rules 1990 (S.I. 1990/2335)
 Agricultural or Forestry Tractors and Tractor Components (Type Approval) (Amendment) Regulations 1990 (S.I. 1990/2336)
 Conservation of Seals (Common Seals) (Shetland Islands Area) Order 1990 (S.I. 1990/2337)
 Conservation of Seals (England) Order 1990 (S.I. 1990/2338)
 M20 Motorway (A249 Sittingbourne Road) Connecting Roads Scheme 1990 (S.I. 1990/2341)
 M20 Motorway (Chrismill Bridge Section)Scheme 1990 (S.I. 1990/2342)
 M20 Motorway (Coldharbour Lane to Sandling Section) Connecting Roads Scheme 1990 (S.I. 1990/2343)
 M20 Motorway (Medway Bridge Section)Scheme 1990 (S.I. 1990/2344)
 Oil Pollution (Compulsory Insurance) (Amendment) (No. 2) Regulations 1990 (S.I. 1990/2345)
 A16 Trunk Road (Ludborough Bypass) Order 1990 (S.I. 1990/2346)
 Broadcasting Act 1990 (Commencement No. 1 and Transitional Provisions) Order 1990 (S.I. 1990/2347)
 Electricity (Restrictive Trade Practices Act 1976) (Exemptions) (No. 4) Order 1990 (S.I. 1990/2348)
 Peak Rail Light Railway Order 1990 (S.I. 1990/2350)
 Education (School Premises) (Amendment)Regulations 1990 (S.I. 1990/2351)
 International Monetary Fund (Increase in Subscription) Order 1990 (S.I. 1990/2352)
 Aberdeen Harbour Revision Order 1990 (S.I. 1990/2359)
 Public Lending Right Scheme 1982 (Commencement of Variations) Order 1990 (S.I. 1990/2360)
 Tax-exempt Special Savings Account Regulations 1990 (S.I. 1990/2361)
 Building Societies (Aggregation) Rules 1990 (S.I. 1990/2362)
 Building Societies (Non-Retail Funds and Deposits) Order 1990 (S.I. 1990/2363)
 Building Societies (Accounts and Related Provisions) (Amendment) Regulations 1990 (S.I. 1990/2364)
 Goods Vehicles (Authorisation of International Journeys) (Fees) (Amendment) Regulations 1990 (S.I. 1990/2365)
 New Towns (Transfer of Housing Stock) (Amendment) Regulations 1990 (S.I. 1990/2366)
 Local Statutory Provisions (Postponement of Repeal) (Scotland) Order 1990 (S.I. 1990/2370)
 Channel Tunnel (Amendment of Agriculture, Fisheries and Food Import Legislation) Order 1990 (S.I. 1990/2371)
 Food Safety Act 1990 (Commencement No. 2) Order 1990 (S.I. 1990/2372)
 Army Terms of Service (Amendment) Regulations 1990 (S.I. 1990/2373)
 Royal Air Force Terms of Service (Amendment) Regulations 1990 (S.I. 1990/2374)
 Public Telecommunication System Designation (Harrogate Telecommunications Complex Limited) Order 1990 (S.I. 1990/2375)
 Public Telecommunication System Designation (York Telecommunications Complex Limited) Order 1990 (S.I. 1990/2376)
 Electrical Equipment for Explosive Atmospheres (Certification) (Amendment) Regulations 1990 (S.I. 1990/2377)
 Employment Act 1990 (Commencement and Transitional Provisions) Order 1990 (S.I. 1990/2378)
 Funds for Trade Union Ballots (Amendment) Regulations 1990 (S.I. 1990/2379)
 Local Government (Compensation for Redundancy and Premature Retirement) (Amendment) Regulations 1990 (S.I. 1990/2380)
 A16 Trunk Road (Stickford Bypass) Order 1990 (S.I. 1990/2382)
 A16 Trunk Road (Stickford Bypass) (Detrunking) Order 1990 (S.I. 1990/2383)
 Patents Rules 1990 (S.I. 1990/2384)
 Motor Vehicles (Driving Licences) (Amendment) (No. 6) Regulations 1990 (S.I. 1990/2385)
 Central Institutions (Recognition) (Scotland) (No.2) Regulations 1990 (S.I. 1990/2386)
 Glasgow College of Technology and Robert Gordon's Institute of Technology (Change of Name) Regulations 1990 (S.I. 1990/2387)
 Broadcasting (Number of Houses in an Area for Purposes of Diffusion Service Licence) Order 1990 (S.I. 1990/2388)
 Broadcasting (Local Delivery Services) Order 1990 (S.I. 1990/2389)
 Housing (Right to Buy) (Priority of Charges) (No. 2) Order 1990 (S.I. 1990/2390)
 Mortgage Indemnities (Recognised Bodies)(No. 2) Order 1990 (S.I. 1990/2391)
 Cream (Heat Treatment) (Scotland) Amendment Regulations 1990 (S.I. 1990/2392)
 Cod (Specified Sea Areas) (Prohibition of Fishing) Order 1990 (S.I. 1990/2394)
 Public Telecommunication System Designation (Cable Communications (Wigan) Limited) Order 1990 (S.I. 1990/2397)
 Plant Health (Forestry) (Great Britain) (Amendment) Order 1990 (S.I. 1990/2398)
 Accommodation of Children (Charge and Control) Amendment Regulations 1990 (S.I. 1990/2399)
 Public Telecommunication System Designation (United Artists Communications (North Thames Estuary) Limited) Order 1990 (S.I. 1990/2400)

2401-2500

 Anglian Harbours National Health Service Trust (Establishment) Order 1990 (S.I. 1990/2401)
 Bradford Hospitals National Health Service Trust (Establishment) Order 1990 (S.I. 1990/2402)
 Broadgreen Hospital National Health Service Trust (Establishment) Order 1990 (S.I. 1990/2403)
 Cardiothoracic Centre — Liverpool National Health Service Trust (Establishment) Order 1990 (S.I. 1990/2404)
 Central Middlesex Hospital National Health Service Trust (Establishment) Order 1990 (S.I. 1990/2405)
 Chester and Halton Community National Health Service Trust (Establishment) Order 1990 (S.I. 1990/2406)
 Christie Hospital National Health Service Trust (Establishment) Order 1990 (S.I. 1990/2407)
 Cornwall and Isles of Scilly Mental Handicap National Health Service Trust (Establishment) Order 1990 (S.I. 1990/2408)
 Cornwall Community Healthcare National Health Service Trust (Establishment) Order 1990 (S.I. 1990/2409)
 Croydon Community National Health Service Trust (Establishment) Order 1990 (S.I. 1990/2410)
 Doncaster Royal Infirmary and Montagu Hospital National Health Service Trust (Establishment) Order 1990 (S.I. 1990/2411)
 East Gloucestershire National Health Service Trust (Establishment) Order 1990 (S.I. 1990/2412)
 East Somerset National Health Service Trust (Establishment) Order 1990 (S.I. 1990/2413)
 Epsom Health Care National Health Service Trust (Establishment) Order 1990 (S.I. 1990/2414)
 First Community National Health Service Trust (Establishment) Order 1990 (S.I. 1990/2415)
 Freeman Group of Hospitals National Health Service Trust (Establishment) Order 1990 (S.I. 1990/2416)
 Guy's and Lewisham National Health Service Trust (Establishment) Order 1990 (S.I. 1990/2417)
 Hillingdon Hospital National Health Service Trust (Establishment) Order 1990 (S.I. 1990/2418)
 Homewood National Health Service Trust (Establishment) Order 1990 (S.I. 1990/2419)
 Kingston Hospital National Health Service Trust (Establishment) Order 1990 (S.I. 1990/2420)
 Leeds General Infirmary and Associated Hospitals National Health Service Trust (Establishment) Order 1990 (S.I. 1990/2421)
 Lifecare National Health Service Trust (Establishment) Order 1990 (S.I. 1990/2422)
 Lincolnshire Ambulance and Health Transport Service National Health Service Trust (Establishment) Order 1990 (S.I. 1990/2423)
 Manchester Central Hospitals and Community Care National Health Service Trust (Establishment) Order 1990 (S.I. 1990/2424)
 Mental Health Foundation of Mid Staffordshire National Health Service Trust (Establishment) Order 1990 (S.I. 1990/2425)
 Mid Cheshire Hospitals National Health Service Trust (Establishment) Order 1990 (S.I. 1990/2426)
 Mount Vernon Hospital National Health Service Trust (Establishment) Order 1990 (S.I. 1990/2427)
 Newcastle Mental Health National Health Service Trust (Establishment) Order 1990 (S.I. 1990/2428)
 Norfolk Ambulance National Health Service Trust (Establishment) Order 1990 (S.I. 1990/2429)
 North Hertfordshire National Health Service Trust (Establishment) Order 1990 (S.I. 1990/2430)
 North Middlesex Hospital National Health Service Trust (Establishment) Order 1990 (S.I. 1990/2431)
 Northern General Hospital National Health Service Trust (Establishment) Order 1990 (S.I. 1990/2432)
 Northumbria Ambulance Service National Health Service Trust (Establishment) Order 1990 (S.I. 1990/2433)
 Nuffield Orthopaedic Centre National Health Service Trust (Establishment) Order 1990 (S.I. 1990/2434)
 Royal Free Hampstead National Health Service Trust (Establishment) Order 1990 (S.I. 1990/2435)
 Royal Liverpool Children's Hospital and Community Services National Health Service Trust (Establishment) Order 1990 (S.I. 1990/2436)
 Royal Liverpool University Hospital National Health Service Trust (Establishment) Order 1990 (S.I. 1990/2437)
 Royal London Hospital and Associated Community Services National Health Service Trust (Establishment) Order 1990 (S.I. 1990/2438)
 Royal National Hospital for Rheumatic Diseases National Health Service Trust (Establishment) Order 1990 (S.I. 1990/2439)
 Royal National Orthopaedic Hospital National Health Service Trust (Establishment) Order 1990 (S.I. 1990/2440)
 Royal National Throat, Nose and Ear Hospital National Health Service Trust (Establishment) Order 1990 (S.I. 1990/2441)
 Royal Surrey County and St. Luke's Hospitals National Health Service Trust (Establishment) Order 1990 (S.I. 1990/2442)
 Rugby National Health Service Trust (Establishment) Order 1990 (S.I. 1990/2443)
 South Devon Health Care National Health Service Trust (Establishment) Order 1990 (S.I. 1990/2444)
 Southend Health Care Services National Health Service Trust (Establishment) Order 1990 (S.I. 1990/2445)
 St. Helens and Knowsley Hospital Services National Health Service Trust (Establishment) Order 1990 (S.I. 1990/2446)
 St. Helier National Health Service Trust (Establishment) Order 1990 (S.I. 1990/2447)
 St. James's University Hospital National Health Service Trust (Establishment) Order 1990 (S.I. 1990/2448)
 Taunton and Somerset National Health Service Trust (Establishment) Order 1990 (S.I. 1990/2449)
 United Bristol Healthcare National Health Service Trust (Establishment) Order 1990 (S.I. 1990/2450)
 Walsall Hospitals National Health Service Trust (Establishment) Order 1990 (S.I. 1990/2451)
 West Dorset Community Health National Health Service Trust (Establishment) Order 1990 (S.I. 1990/2452)
 West Dorset General Hospitals National Health Service Trust (Establishment) Order 1990 (S.I. 1990/2453)
 West Dorset Mental Health National Health Service Trust (Establishment) Order 1990 (S.I. 1990/2454)
 Weston Area National Health Service Trust (Establishment) Order 1990 (S.I. 1990/2455)
 Wirral Hospital National Health Service Trust (Establishment) Order 1990 (S.I. 1990/2456)
 Smoke Control Areas (Exempted Fireplaces) (No. 2) Order 1990 (S.I. 1990/2457)
 Liquor Licensing (Fees) (Scotland) Order 1990 (S.I. 1990/2458)
 Animals (Scientific Procedures) Act (Fees) Order 1990 (S.I. 1990/2459)
 Insurance Brokers Registration Council (Indemnity Insurance and Grants Scheme) (Amendment) Rules Approval Order 1990 (S.I. 1990/2461)
 Food Safety (Enforcement Authority) (England and Wales) Order 1990 (S.I. 1990/2462)
 Food Safety (Sampling and Qualifications) Regulations 1990 (S.I. 1990/2463)
 Local Government Act 1988 (Defined Activities) (Specified Periods) (Inner London) Regulations 1990 (S.I. 1990/2468)
 Petroleum Revenue Tax (Nomination Scheme for Disposals and Appropriations) (Amendment) Regulations 1990 (S.I. 1990/2469)
 Hampshire (Minley Interchange) (M3) Motorway Scheme 1989 Confirmation Instrument 1990 (S.I. 1990/2470)
 Enrolment of Deeds (Change of Name) (Amendment) Regulations 1990 (S.I. 1990/2471)
 Non-Domestic Rating Contributions (England) (Amendment) Regulations 1990 (S.I. 1990/2472)
 Town and Country Planning (Fees for Applications and Deemed Applications) (Amendment) Regulations 1990 Approved by both Houses of ParliamentS.I. 1990/2473)
 Town and Country Planning (Fees for Applications and Deemed Applications) (Scotland) Amendment Regulations 1990 (S.I. 1990/2474)
 Community Charges (Administration and Enforcement) (Amendment) (No. 3) Regulations 1990 (S.I. 1990/2475)
 Parish and Community Councils (Committees)Regulations 1990 (S.I. 1990/2476)
 Local Elections (Parishes and Communities)(Declaration of Acceptance of Office) Order 1990 (S.I. 1990/2477)
 Public Telecommunication System Designation (Fenland Cablevision Limited) Order 1990 (S.I. 1990/2478)
 Public Telecommunication System Designation (South Yorkshire Cablevision Limited) (the Boroughs of Doncaster and Rotherham) Order 1990 (S.I. 1990/2479)
 Local Government Superannuation (Investments) Regulations 1990 (S.I. 1990/2480)
 Sole (Specified Sea Areas) (Prohibition of Fishing) Order 1990 (S.I. 1990/2481)
 Civil Aviation (Route Charges for Navigation Services) (Second Amendment) Regulations 1990 (S.I. 1990/2482)
 Statutory Nuisance (Appeals) (Amendment) Regulations 1990 (S.I. 1990/2483)
 Courts and Legal Services Act 1990 (Commencement No. 2) Order 1990 (S.I. 1990/2484)
 Legal Services Ombudsman (Jurisdiction) Order 1990 (S.I. 1990/2485)
 Food Safety Act 1990 (Consequential Modifications) (England and Wales) Order 1990 (S.I. 1990/2486)
 Food Safety Act 1990 (Consequential Modifications) (No 2) (Great Britain) Order 1990 (S.I. 1990/2487)
 Food Labelling (Amendment) Regulations 1990 (S.I. 1990/2488)
 Food Labelling (Amendment) (Irradiated Food) Regulations 1990 (S.I. 1990/2489)
 Food (Control of Irradiation) Regulations 1990 (S.I. 1990/2490)
 Milk & Dairies (Semi-skimmed and Skimmed Milk) (Heat Treatment and Labelling) (Amendment) Regulations 1990 (S.I. 1990/2491)
 Milk (Special Designation) (Amendment) Regulations 1990 (S.I. 1990/2492)
 Fresh Meat Export (Hygiene and Inspection) (Amendment) Regulations 1990 (S.I. 1990/2493)
 Fresh Meat and Poultry Meat (Hygiene, Inspection and Examinations for Residues) (Charges) Regulations 1990 (S.I. 1990/2494)
 Meat Inspection (Amendment) Regulations 1990 (S.I. 1990/2495)
 Medicines (Veterinary Drugs) (Pharmacy and Merchants' List) (No. 2) (Amendment No. 2) Order 1990 (S.I. 1990/2496)
 National Health Service (General Dental Services) (Scotland) Amendment Regulations 1990 (S.I. 1990/2497)
 Local Government Act 1988 (Defined Activities) (Competition) (Scotland) Amendment (No.2) Regulations 1990 (S.I. 1990/2498)
 Non-Domestic Rating Contributions (Wales) (Amendment) Regulations 1990 (S.I. 1990/2499)
 Conservation of Seals (England) (No. 2) Order 1990 (S.I. 1990/2500)

2501-2600

 National Health Service (General Dental Services) Amendment Regulations 1990 (S.I. 1990/2501)
 Marine, & c, Broadcasting (Offences) (Prescribed Areas of the High Seas) Order 1990 (S.I. 1990/2503)
 Radioactive Substances (Appeals) Regulations 1990 (S.I. 1990/2504)
 Food Labelling (Amendment) (Irradiated Food) (Scotland) Regulations 1990 (S.I. 1990/2505)
 Food Labelling (Scotland) Amendment Regulations 1990 (S.I. 1990/2506)
 Milk and Dairies (Scotland) Regulations 1990 (S.I. 1990/2507)
 Milk Labelling (Scotland) Amendment Regulations 1990 (S.I. 1990/2508)
 National Health Service (General Medical and Pharmaceutical Services) (Scotland) Amendment (No.2) Regulations 1990 (S.I. 1990/2509)
 National Health Service and Community Care Act 1990 (Commencement No. 5 and Revocation) (Scotland) Order 1990 (S.I. 1990/2510)
 National Health Service and Community Care Act 1990 (Commencement No. 6—Amendment, and Transitional and Saving Provisions) Order 1990 (S.I. 1990/2511)
 Radioactive Substances (Hospitals) Exemption Order 1990 (S.I. 1990/2512)
 National Health Service (General Medical and Pharmaceutical Services) Amendment (No. 3) Regulations 1990 (S.I. 1990/2513)
 Civil Aviation (Joint Financing) (Second Amendment) Regulations 1990 (S.I. 1990/2514)
 Registration of Births, Deaths and Marriages (Fees) (No. 2) Order 1990 (S.I. 1990/2515)
 Teachers' Pay and Conditions Act 1987(Continuation) Order 1990 (S.I. 1990/2516)
 Patents (Fees) (No. 2) Rules 1990 (S.I. 1990/2517)
 Education Support Grants Regulations 1990 (S.I. 1990/2518)
 Social Work (Representations Procedure) (Scotland) Order 1990 (S.I. 1990/2519)
 A41 Trunk Road (Hendon Way, Barnet) (Speed Limit) Order 1990 (S.I. 1990/2520)
 A27 Trunk Road (Westhampnett Bypass and Slip Roads) Order 1990 (S.I. 1990/2521)
 A27 Trunk Road(Westhampnett Bypass Detrunking) Order 1990 (S.I. 1990/2522)
 Public Telecommunication System Designation (Cable Communications (Barnsley) Limited) Order 1990 (S.I. 1990/2523)
 Lloyd's Underwriters (Schedule 19A to the Income and Corporation Taxes Act 1988) Regulations 1990 (S.I. 1990/2524)
 A17 Trunk Road (Wigtoft—Sutterton Bypass) and the A16 Trunk Road (Diversion at Blackitt's Farm) Order 1990 (S.I. 1990/2525)
 A16 Trunk Road (Blackitt's Farm to Sutterton) Detrunking Order 1990 (S.I. 1990/2526)
 A17 Trunk Road (Wigtoft—Sutterton Bypass) Detrunking Order 1990 (S.I. 1990/2527)
 Sea Fishing (Enforcement of Community Control Measures) (Amendment) Order 1990 (S.I. 1990/2528)
 Debts of Overseas Governments (Determination of Relevant Percentage) Regulations 1990 (S.I. 1990/2529)
 Air Navigation (Dangerous Goods) (Third Amendment) Regulations 1990 (S.I. 1990/2531)
 A1 Trunk Road (Haringey) (Bus Lanes) Red Route Experimental Traffic Order 1990 (S.I. 1990/2532)
 A1 Trunk Road (Haringey) Red Route Experimental Traffic Order 1990 (S.I. 1990/2533)
 A1 Trunk Road (Islington) (Bus Lanes)Red Route Experimental Traffic Order 1990 (S.I. 1990/2534)
 A1 Trunk Road (Islington) Red Route Experimental Traffic Order 1990 (S.I. 1990/2535)
 Broadcasting Act 1990 (Independent Radio Services: Exceptions) Order 1990 (S.I. 1990/2536)
 Broadcasting Act 1990 (Independent Television Services: Exceptions) Order 1990 (S.I. 1990/2537)
 Workmen's Compensation (Supplementation) (Amendment) and the Pneumoconiosis, Byssinosis and Miscellaneous Diseases Benefit (Amendment) Scheme 1990 (S.I. 1990/2538)
 Personal Community Charge (Relief) (Scotland) Amendment (No. 2) Regulations 1990 (S.I. 1990/2539)
 Broadcasting (Transfer Date and Nominated Company) Order 1990 (S.I. 1990/2540)
 A6 London—Inverness Trunk Road(Rothwell Interchange and Slip Roads) Order 1990 (S.I. 1990/2541)
 A43 Oxford—Market Deeping Trunk Road (South West Kettering to Weekley) Detrunking Order 1990 (S.I. 1990/2542)
 A604 Catthorpe—Harwich Trunk Road (Catthorpe to Rothwell Section and Slip Roads) Supplementary Order 1990 (S.I. 1990/2543)
 A604 Catthorpe—Harwich Trunk Road (Catthorpe to Rothwell Section and Slip Roads) Supplementary Order (No. 2) 1990 (S.I. 1990/2544)
 Life Assurance (Apportionment of Receipts of Participating Funds) (Applicable Percentage) (Amendment) Order 1990 (S.I. 1990/2546)
 Stock Transfer (Gilt-edged Securities) (Exempt Transfer) (No. 2) Regulations 1990 (S.I. 1990/2547)
 Value Added Tax (Imported Goods) Relief (Amendment) Order 1990 (S.I. 1990/2548)
 Industrial Training (Hotel and Catering Board) (Revocation) Order 1990 (S.I. 1990/2549)
 Housing Revenue Account General Fund Contribution Limits (Scotland) Order 1990 (S.I. 1990/2550)
 Special Schools (Scotland) Grant Regulations 1990 (S.I. 1990/2551)
 Income Tax (Stock Lending) (Amendment) Regulations 1990 (S.I. 1990/2552)
 Value Added Tax (Construction of Dwellings and Land) Order 1990 (S.I. 1990/2553)
 Sole (Western English Channel) (Prohibition of Fishing) Order 1990 (S.I. 1990/2554)
 Housing Benefit (General) Amendment No. 3 Regulations 1990 (S.I. 1990/2564)
 Environmental Protection Act 1990 (Commencement No. 3) Order 1990 (S.I. 1990/2565)
 Broadcasting Act 1990 (Commencement Date for Complaints under Part V) Order 1990 (S.I. 1990/2566)
 Folkestone, Mid-Sussex and West Kent (Pipelaying and Other Works) (Codes of Practice) Order 1990 (S.I. 1990/2567)
 Companies Act 1989 (Commencement No. 8 and Transitional and Saving Provisions) Order 1990 (S.I. 1990/2569)
 Companies (Revision of Defective Accounts and Report) Regulations 1990 (S.I. 1990/2570)
 Companies (Unregistered Companies) (Amendment No. 3) Regulations 1990 (S.I. 1990/2571)
 Public Telecommunication System Designation (Cable Thames Valley Limited) Order 1990 (S.I. 1990/2572)
 Protection of Wrecks (Designation No. 3) Order 1990 (S.I. 1990/2573)
 East Anglian Water (Constitution and Regulation) Order 1990 (S.I. 1990/2574)
 Damages for Bereavement (Variation of Sum)(England and Wales) Order 1990 (S.I. 1990/2575)
 Damages for Bereavement (Variation of Sum) (Northern Ireland) Order 1990 (S.I. 1990/2576)
 A604 Catthorpe—Harwich Trunk Road (Thrapston to Brampton Section and Slip Roads) Order (No. 2) Supplementary Order 1990 (S.I. 1990/2577)
 Broadcasting Complaints Commission and Control of Misleading Advertisements (Transitional Provisions) Order 1990cS.I. 1990/2579)
 Police and Criminal Evidence Act 1984 (Codes of Practice) (No. 2) Order 1990 (S.I. 1990/2580)
 Local Government and Housing Act 1989 (Commencement No. 10) Order 1990 (S.I. 1990/2581)
 Food Protection (Emergency Prohibitions) (Lead in Cattle) (England) (No. 2) Order 1990 (S.I. 1990/2582)
 National Health Service (Appointment of Consultants) (Wales) Amendment Regulations 1990 (S.I. 1990/2583)
 House of Commons Disqualification Order 1990 (S.I. 1990/2585)
 Consular Fees (Amendment) Order 1990 (S.I. 1990/2586)
 Registrar of British Ships (Gibraltar) (Revocation) Order 1990 (S.I. 1990/2587)
 Criminal Justice (Confiscation)(Northern Ireland) Order 1990 (S.I. 1990/2588)
 Misuse of Drugs Act 1971 (Modification) Order 1990 (S.I. 1990/2589)
 Double Taxation Relief (Taxes on Income) (Italy) Order 1990 (S.I. 1990/2590)
 Civil Jurisdiction and Judgments Act 1982 (Amendment) Order 1990 (S.I. 1990/2591)
 Foreign Marriage (Armed Forces) (Amendment No. 2) Order 1990 (S.I. 1990/2592)
 Trade Marks and Service Marks (Relevant Countries) (Amendment) Order 1990 (S.I. 1990/2593)
 Hovercraft (Application of Enactments) (Amendment) Order 1990 (S.I. 1990/2594)
 Merchant Shipping (Prevention and Control of Pollution) Order 1990 (S.I. 1990/2595)
 Ministerial and other Salaries Order 1990 (S.I. 1990/2596)
 Statistics of Trade Act 1947 (Amendment of Schedule) Order 1990 (S.I. 1990/2597)
 Transfer of Functions (Radioactive Substances) (Wales) Order 1990 (S.I. 1990/2598)
 Building (Amendment of Prescribed Fees) Regulations 1990 (S.I. 1990/2600)

2601-2700

 Merchant Shipping (IBC Code) (Amendment) Regulations 1990 (S.I. 1990/2602)
 Merchant Shipping (BCH Code) (Amendment) Regulations 1990 (S.I. 1990/2603)
 Merchant Shipping (Control of Pollution by Noxious Liquid Substances in Bulk) (Amendment) Regulations 1990 (S.I. 1990/2604)
 Merchant Shipping (Dangerous Goods and Marine Pollutants) Regulations 1990 (S.I. 1990/2605)
 Road Traffic (Driver Licensing and Information Systems) Act 1989 (Commencement No. 4) Order 1990 (S.I. 1990/2610)
 Motor Vehicles (Driving Licences) (Heavy Goods and Public Service Vehicles) Regulations 1990 (S.I. 1990/2611)
 Motor Vehicles (Driving Licences) (Large Goods and Passenger-Carrying Vehicles) Regulations 1990 (S.I. 1990/2612)
 Land Registration (Charges) Rules 1990 (S.I. 1990/2613)
 Detention of Food (Prescribed Forms) Regulations 1990 (S.I. 1990/2614)
 Quick-frozen Foodstuffs Regulations 1990 (S.I. 1990/2615)
 A41 London—Birmingham Trunk Road (Berkhamsted Bypass Slip Road) Order 1990 (S.I. 1990/2616)
 Police Cadets (Amendment No. 2) Regulations 1990 (S.I. 1990/2618)
 Police (Amendment No. 4) Regulations 1990 (S.I. 1990/2619)
 Firearms (Amendment) Act 1988 (Commencement No. 3) Order 1990 (S.I. 1990/2620)
 Firearms (Removal to Northern Ireland) Order 1990 (S.I. 1990/2621)
 Roads (Scotland) Act 1984 (Commencement No.3) Order 1990 (S.I. 1990/2622)
 Road Humps (Scotland) Regulations 1990 (S.I. 1990/2623)
 Law Reform (Miscellaneous Provisions) (Scotland) Act 1990 (Commencement No. 2) Order 1990 (S.I. 1990/2624)
 Food Safety Act 1990 (Consequential Modifications) (Scotland) Order 1990 (S.I. 1990/2625)
 Weights and Measures (Local and Working Standard Capacity Measures and Testing Equipment) Regulations 1990 (S.I. 1990/2626)
 Welfare of Horses at Markets (and Other Places of Sale) Order 1990 (S.I. 1990/2627)
 Welfare of Animals at Markets Order 1990 (S.I. 1990/2628)
 Misuse of Drugs (Amendment) Regulations 1990 (S.I. 1990/2630)
 Misuse of Drugs (Designation) (Variation) Order 1990 (S.I. 1990/2631)
 Export of Goods (Control) (Amendment No. 6) Order 1990 (S.I. 1990/2632)
 Plant Breeders' Rights (Amendment) (No. 2) Regulations 1990 (S.I. 1990/2633)
 Plant Breeders' Rights (Miscellaneous Ornamental Plants) (Variation) Scheme 1990 (S.I. 1990/2634)
 Environmental Protection Act 1990 (Commencement No. 4) Order 1990 (S.I. 1990/2635)
 Marriage Fees (Scotland) Regulations 1990 (S.I. 1990/2636)
 Registration of Births, Deaths and Marriages (Fees) (Scotland) Order 1990 (S.I. 1990/2637)
 Registration of Births, Deaths, Marriages and Divorces (Fees) (Scotland) Regulations 1990 (S.I. 1990/2638)
 Health Education Board for Scotland Order 1990 (S.I. 1990/2639)
 Goods Vehicles (Operators' Licences, Qualifications and Fees) (Amendment) (No. 2) Regulations 1990 (S.I. 1990/2640)
 Public Service Vehicle Operators (Qualifications) (Amendment) Regulations 1990 (S.I. 1990/2641)
 Social Security (Widow's Benefit and Retirement Pensions) Amendment Regulations 1990 (S.I. 1990/2642)
 Combined Probation Areas (Somerset) Order 1990 (S.I. 1990/2643)
 Customs Duties (ECSC) (Quota and other Reliefs) Order 1990 (S.I. 1990/2645)
 Welsh Health Common Services Authority Constitution Order 1990 (S.I. 1990/2647)
 Welsh Health Common Services Authority Regulations 1990 (S.I. 1990/2648)
 A604 Catthorpe–Harwich Trunk Road (Thrapston to Brampton Section and Slip Roads) Order (No. 2) 1987 Variation Order and New Trunk Roads Order 1990 (S.I. 1990/2649)
 A604 Catthorpe-Harwich Trunk Road (Thrapston to Brampton Section and Slip roads) Order (No. 2) Supplementary Order (No 2) 1990 (S.I. 1990/2650)
 Community Charges and Non-Domestic Rating (Demand Notices) (England) (Amendment) (No. 2) Regulations 1990 (S.I. 1990/2656)
 Community Charges and Non-Domestic Rating (Demand Notices) (City of London) (Amendment) Regulations 1990 (S.I. 1990/2657)
 M6 Motorway: Widening between Junctions 20 and 21A (Thelwall Viaduct) and Connecting Roads Scheme 1990 (S.I. 1990/2659)
 Customs and Excise (Community Transit) (No.2) Regulations 1987 (Amendment) Regulations 1990 (S.I. 1990/2660)
 Public Telecommunication System Designation (Heartland Cablevision II (UK) Limited) (Nuneaton and Bedworth District and Part of North Warwickshire Borough) Order 1990 (S.I. 1990/2661)
 London—Great Yarmouth Trunk Road (A12) (Kessingland Bypass, Suffolk) Order 1990 (S.I. 1990/2662)

External links
Legislation.gov.uk delivered by the UK National Archive
UK SI's on legislation.gov.uk
UK Draft SI's on legislation.gov.uk

See also
 List of Statutory Instruments of the United Kingdom

Lists of Statutory Instruments of the United Kingdom
Statutory Instruments